= 2011–12 Leeds United F.C. season =

2011–12 season of Leeds United

Leeds United
2011–12 season
- Chairman: Ken Bates
- Manager: Simon Grayson (until 1 February); Neil Redfearn (caretaker, until 20 Feb); Neil Warnock (from 18 February)
- Stadium: Elland Road
- Championship: 14th
- FA Cup: Third round
- League Cup: Third round
- Top goalscorer: League: Ross McCormack (18); All: Ross McCormack (19)
- Highest home attendance: 33,366 vs West Ham United (17 March 2012, Championship)
- Lowest home attendance: 17,665 vs Bradford City (9 August 2011, League Cup)
- Average home league attendance: 23,369
Home colours	Away colours	Third colours

The 2011–12 season saw Leeds United competing in the Championship (known as the npower Championship for sponsorship reasons) for a second successive season.

== Season summary ==
A turbulent February saw Reserve Team Manager Neil Redfearn in charge of the team for four games with Manager Simon Grayson relieved of his duties and replaced by veteran promotion specialist Neil Warnock. Ross McCormack drastically improved his performance from the 2010–11 season by scoring 19 goals – the most in the squad. He narrowly lost out on Player of the Year to Robert Snodgrass who was made Club Captain by Warnock following the sale of influential local skipper Jonny Howson in January. Young Player of the Year went to Tom Lees who led an injection of the youth into the side with Aidan White establishing himself in the starting line-up and debuts being handed to youngsters Zac Thompson, Charlie Taylor and keeper Alex Cairns.

Off the field, the club's directors reported a healthy profit of £3.5m, but found themselves at war with some supporters following the controversial £7m summer renovation of the Elland Road stadium – a summer which saw a contrasting £0.7m spent on players' transfers and £5.2m received in player sales. Chairman Ken Bates also came under scrutiny from fans following the departures of fans' favourite Howson and 2010–11 Player of the Year Max Gradel.

== Events ==
This is a list of the significant events to occur at the club during the 2011–12 season, presented in chronological order (starting from 11 May 2011 and ending on the final day of the club's final match in the 2011–12 season. This list does not include transfers or new contracts, which are listed in the transfers section below, or match results, which are in the matches section.

=== May ===
- 11 May: Chairman, Ken Bates reveals that defender Federico Bessone and striker Mike Grella have been placed on the transfer list

=== June ===
- 30 June: The players return for pre-season training with only one new face, goalkeeper Paul Rachubka

=== July ===
- 11 July: Long serving Club President, George Lascelles, 7th Earl of Harewood KBE passes away at the age of 88. Lord Harewood became President of the club in 1961 and was also President of the FA from 1963 to 1972.
- 13 July: Patricia Lascelles, Countess of Harewood accepts chairman, Ken Bates' offer of becoming the new Club Patron after the passing of her husband, Lord Harewood.
- 16 July: Manager, Simon Grayson bans his players from social networking website Twitter after striker Davide Somma revealed on his Twitter account, against the wishes of the boss, that he would be out injured for "five or six months". At the time of the ban, professionals Adam Clayton, Max Gradel, Mike Grella, Will Hatfield, Ross McCormack, Ramón Núñez, Lloyd Sam, Charlie Taylor, Zac Thompson, Somma and a handful of academy players had Twitter accounts. Andy O'Brien previously tweeted, but deleted his account after receiving abuse from other users.

=== October ===
- 21 October: It is revealed that a planned statue of former manager Don Revie by Graham Ibbeson, will be located opposite the East Stand of Elland Road.
- 24 October: The club announce that several new hospitality suites will open for the first time for the home game against Cardiff City on 30 October. The suites form part of the ongoing redevelopment of Elland Road's East Stand.

=== November ===
- 8 November: Leeds receive the Level Playing Field Award following an audit of Elland Road to access its suitability for disabled staff and fans.
- 19 November: Simon Grayson announces that Andy O'Brien will not play for the club again after revealing that O'Brien refused to play in the match against Burnley
- 27 November: The club extends its sympathies to the family of former player Gary Speed who died earlier in the day, reportedly after committing suicide. Leeds later announced that a new suite in the East Stand of Elland Road would be named in Speed's honour, while the team wore black armbands and took part in a minute's applause for Speed before the away game against Nottingham Forest on 29 November and the home game against Millwall on 3 December.

=== February ===
- 1 February: Simon Grayson is sacked as manager following the 4–1 home defeat to Birmingham City the previous day. In an official statement, the club's chief executive Shaun Harvey, stated that Leeds made the decision in the belief that "a new managerial team will be able to get more out of the existing squad of players" and ensure a play-off finish. Reserve team manager Neil Redfearn is appointed caretaker manager with immediate effect.
- 18 February: After nearly three weeks of speculation, Neil Warnock is announced as the new club manager with an 18-month contract. A number of high-profile managers were confirmed to have applied for the post, including Raddy Antic, Phil Brown, Sven-Göran Eriksson and Albert Ferrer. Redfearn and his coaching staff return to their usual jobs at the club.

== Pre-season ==
13 July 2011	Falkirk	0–2	Leeds United	Falkirk Stadium
19:45		Report	Scobbie 37' (o.g.); Snodgrass 53'

16 July 2011	Motherwell	1–2	Leeds United	Fir Park
15:00	Murphy 39'	Report	Bruce 68'; Núñez 75'

19 July 2011	Rochdale	0–1	Leeds United	Spotland Stadium
19:30		Report	Gradel 30'	Attendance: 3935

23 July 2011	Sheffield Wednesday	1–1	Leeds United	Hillsborough Stadium
13:00	Prutton 8'	Report	Gradel 84' (pen.)

26 July 2011	Sandefjord	1–1	Leeds United	Adeccoligaen
19:00	Stokke 87'	Report	Núñez 90'

31 July 2011	Leeds United	3–2	Newcastle United	Elland Road
14:00	Kisnorbo 5'; Sam 67'; Paynter 85'		S. Taylor 35'; Vučkić 77'	Attendance: 20,457

== Competitions ==
=== Championship ===
==== League table ====
Pos	Team	Pld	W	D	L	GF	GA	GD	Pts
12	Derby County	46	18	10	18	50	58	−8	64
13	Burnley	46	17	11	18	61	58	+3	62
14	Leeds United	46	17	10	19	65	68	−3	61
15	Ipswich Town	46	17	10	19	69	77	−8	61
16	Millwall	46	15	12	19	55	57	−2	57

Updated to match(es) played on 28 April 2012. Source: BBC Sport
Rules for classification: 1) points; 2) goal difference; 3) number of goals scored.

==== Results summary ====
Overall								Home						Away					
Pld	W	D	L	GF	GA	GD	Pts	W	D	L	GF	GA	GD	W	D	L	GF	GA	GD
46	17	10	19	65	68	−3	61	9	3	11	34	41	−7	8	7	8	31	27	+4

Last updated: 28 April 2012.
Source: The Football League

==== Results by round ====
Round	1	2	3	4	5	6	7	8	9	10	11	12	13	14	15	16	17	18	19	20	21	22	23	24	25	26	27	28	29	30	31	32	33	34	35	36	37	38	39	40	41	42	43	44	45	46
Ground	A	H	H	A	A	H	H	A	H	A	H	A	A	H	H	A	A	H	A	H	A	H	A	A	H	A	H	H	A	H	A	H	A	H	A	A	H	H	A	H	H	H	H	A	A	H
Result	L	L	W	D	L	W	W	D	W	W	D	W	L	D	L	W	W	L	W	W	D	L	L	L	W	D	W	L	W	L	L	W	D	L	D	W	D	L	W	L	L	W	W	L	D	L
Position	23	23	13	13	19	12	11	9	11	5	10	5	5	7	10	7	5	5	5	5	6	6	8	10	8	11	9	10	9	10	11	10	10	10	10	10	10	10	10	12	12	12	12	12	13	14

Updated to match(es) played on 28 April 2012. Source: Competitive Matches
A = Away; H = Home; W = Win; D = Draw; L = Loss

==== Matches ====
6 August 2011 1	Southampton	3–1	Leeds United	St Mary's Stadium
17:20	Hammond 10'; Lallana 25'; Connolly 52'	Report	Gradel 90+5' (pen.)	Attendance: 25,860 (3,097 Leeds); Referee: K. Wright

13 August 2011 2	Leeds United	0–1	Middlesbrough	Elland Road
15:00	Gradel (yellow card) 26' (red card); Howson (yellow card) 59' (red card)	Report	Emnes 67'; McMahon (yellow card) 45+2' (red card)	Attendance: 25,650; Referee: A. Taylor

16 August 2011 3	Leeds United	4–1	Hull City	Elland Road
19:45	McCormack 17'; Lees 40'; Snodgrass 47'; Nunez 68'	Report	Lees 21' (o.g.)	Attendance: 22,363; Referee: E. Ilderton

21 August 2011 4	West Ham United	2–2	Leeds United	Upton Park
13:15	Cole 6'; Kisnorbo 62' (o.g.)	Report	McCormack 59'; Clayton 90+1'	Attendance: 28,252; Referee: M. Oliver

27 August 2011 5	Ipswich Town	2–1	Leeds United	Portman Road
15:00	Scotland 77'; Andrews 90'	Report	McCormack 34'; White (red card) 48'	Attendance: 19,758; Referee: Andy D'Urso

10 September 2011 6	Leeds United	3–2	Crystal Palace	Elland Road
15:00	McCormack 8', 84'; Becchio 71'	Report	McCarthy 12'; Scannell 21'	Attendance: 23,916; Referee: S. Mathieson

17 September 2011 7	Leeds United	2–1	Bristol City	Elland Road
15:00	Clayton 3'; McCormack 86'; Kisnorbo (red card) 64'	Report	Kilkenny 11'	Attendance: 22,655; Referee: F. Graham

23 September 2011 8	Brighton	3–3	Leeds United	Falmer Stadium
19:45	Mackail-Smith 48', 85'; Barnes 60'	Report	Keogh 19'; McCormack 24', 90+2'	Attendance: 20,646 (2,200 Leeds); Referee: L. Probert

1 October 2011 9	Leeds United	1–0	Portsmouth	Elland Road
15:00	Pugh 14'	Report		Attendance: 22,467; Referee: N. Miller

14 October 2011 10	Doncaster Rovers	0–3	Leeds United	Keepmoat
19:45		Report	Pugh 20'; McCormack 51'; Lees 64'	Attendance: 12,926 (4,209 Leeds); Referee: K. Friend

18 October 2011 11	Leeds United	1–1	Coventry City	Elland Road
19:45	O'Dea 26'	Report	Wood 93'	Attendance: 21,528; Referee: A. Haines

22 October 2011 12	Peterborough United	2–3	Leeds United	London Road
12:00	Zakuani 23'; Little 88'; Tomlin (red card) 36'	Report	Keogh 4'; Clayton 54'; O'Dea 90+5'	Attendance: 12,880; Referee: K. Stroud

26 October 2011 13	Birmingham City	1–0	Leeds United	St Andrew's
19:45	Žigić 35'	Report		Attendance: 21,426 (3,102 Leeds); Referee: C. Foy

30 October 2011 14	Leeds United	1–1	Cardiff City	Elland Road
13:15	Snodgrass 72'	Report	Mason 16'	Attendance: 20,270; Referee: Phil Dowd

2 November 2011 15	Leeds United	0–5	Blackpool	Elland Road
19:45	Lees (red card) 25'	Report	LuaLua 12', 64'; Shelvey 26' (pen.), 30', 77'	Attendance: 22,423; Referee: R. East

6 November 2011 16	Leicester City	0–1	Leeds United	King Power Stadium
15:00		Report	Clayton 69'	Attendance: 27,270 (3,319 Leeds); Referee: O. Langford

19 November 2011 17	Burnley	1–2	Leeds United	Turf Moor
12:45	Rodriguez 10'	Report	Snodgrass 76', 89'	Attendance: 17,226; Referee: S. Mathieson

26 November 2011 18	Leeds United	1–2	Barnsley	Elland Road
15:00	McCormack 55'	Report	Vaz Tê 27'; Davies 43'; Perkins (yellow card) 88' (red card)	Attendance: 25,900; Referee: G. Salisbury

29 November 2011 19	Nottingham Forest	0–4	Leeds United	City Ground
19:45	Reid (yellow card) 78' (red card)	Report	Snodgrass 20'; Howson 45'; Becchio 49'; Clayton 66'	Attendance: 23,577 (3,597 Leeds); Referee: D. Deadman

3 December 2011 20	Leeds United	2–0	Millwall	Elland Road
12:45	Snodgrass 62', 65'	Report		Attendance: 27,161; Referee: M. Oliver

10 December 2011 21	Watford	1–1	Leeds United	Vicarage Road
15:00	Kightly 28'; Sordell (penalty missed)	Report	Snodgrass 90+5' (pen.)	Attendance: 13,573 (2,062 Leeds); Referee: E. Ilderton

17 December 2011 22	Leeds United	0–1	Reading	Elland Road
15:00		Report	Church 2'	Attendance: 23,162; Referee: C. Webster

26 December 2011 23	Derby County	1–0	Leeds United	Pride Park
13:00	Ward 67'	Report		Attendance: 33,010 (4,172 Leeds); Referee: A. Bates

31 December 2011 24	Barnsley	4–1	Leeds United	Oakwell
13:00	Vaz Tê 16', 51', 72'; Davies 61'	Report	Becchio 90+1'	Attendance: 17,499; Referee: R. Swarbrick

2 January 2012 25	Leeds United	2–1	Burnley	Elland Road
15:00	Easton 88' (o.g.); McCormack 90+7'	Report	Austin 69'; Trippier (yellow card) 28' (red card)	Attendance: 27,295; Referee: M. Brown

14 January 2012 26	Crystal Palace	1–1	Leeds United	Selhurst Park
15:00	C. Martin 6'; Scannell (yellow card) 44' (red card)	Report	Snodgrass 63'	Attendance: 17,796 (4,004 Leeds); Referee: D. Coote

21 January 2012 27	Leeds United	3–1	Ipswich Town	Elland Road
15:00	Snodgrass 74'; McCormack 82'; Becchio 90'	Report	Drury 34'; McCarthy (red card) 70'	Attendance: 22,844; Referee: G. Eltringham

31 January 2012 28	Leeds United	1–4	Birmingham City	Elland Road
19:45	McCormack 19'	Report	Žigić 31', 61', 64', 68'	Attendance: 19,628; Referee: M. Dean

4 February 2012 29	Bristol City	0–3	Leeds United	Ashton Gate
15:00	Wilson (red card) 44'; Bolasie (yellow card) 57' (red card)	Report	Snodgrass 40'; McCormack 79'; Becchio 90+2'	Attendance: 15,257 (1,962 Leeds); Referee: J. Linington

11 February 2012 30	Leeds United	1–2	Brighton	Elland Road
15:00	Becchio 79'	Report	Mackail-Smith 77'; Navarro 90'	Attendance: 23,171; Referee: G. Salisbury

14 February 2012 31	Coventry City	2–1	Leeds United	Ricoh Arena
19:45	McSheffrey 21' (pen.), 90+2' (pen.)	Report	McCormack 32'	Attendance: 15,704 (3,214 Leeds); Referee: P. Miller

18 February 2012 32	Leeds United	3–2	Doncaster Rovers	Elland Road
15:00	Townsend 55'; Clayton 80'; Becchio 90+9'	Report	Bakayoyo 32', 54'	Attendance: 21,181; Referee: K. Stroud

25 February 2012 33	Portsmouth	0–0	Leeds United	Fratton Park
15:00		Report		Attendance: 17,571; Referee: P. Gibbs

3 March 2012 34	Leeds United	0–1	Southampton	Elland Road
15:00		Report	Lambert 16'	Attendance: 20,901; Referee: N. Miller

6 March 2012 35	Hull City	0–0	Leeds United	KC Stadium
19:45		Report		Attendance: 22,676; Referee: S. Attwell

11 March 2012 36	Middlesbrough	0–2	Leeds United	Riverside
12:15	Robson (red card) 85'	Report	Snodgrass 18'; Becchio 27'	Attendance: 21,301; Referee: C. Boyeson

17 March 2012 37	Leeds United	1–1	West Ham United	Elland Road
15:00	Becchio 83'	Report	Collins 89'	Attendance: 33,366; Referee: P. Walton

20 March 2012 38	Leeds United	3–7	Nottingham Forest	Elland Road
19:45	Snodgrass 6' (pen.); Becchio 53'; Brown 55'	Report	Guedioura 8'; McCleary 46', 56', 60', 71'; Blackstock 52', 81'	Attendance: 21,367; Referee: E. Ilderton

24 March 2012 39	Millwall	0–1	Leeds United	The Den
15:00		Report	McCormack 65'	Attendance: 14,309; Referee: L. Probert

31 March 2012 40	Leeds United	0–2	Watford	Elland Road
15:00	Connolly (red card) 90+3'	Report	Iwelumo 5', 89'	Attendance: 21,766; Referee: P. Tierney

6 April 2012 41	Reading	2–0	Leeds United	Madejski Stadium
14:00	Le Fondre 84', 90'	Report	Thompson (red card) 12'	Attendance: 22,775; Referee: D. Drysdale

9 April 2012 42	Leeds United	0–2	Derby County	Elland Road
15:00	Brown (red card) 25'	Report	Bryson 32'; Davies 66'	Attendance: 21,363; Referee: O. Langford

14 April 2012 43	Leeds United	4–1	Peterborough United	Elland Road
15:00	Paynter 45+4', 72'; McCormack 47', 48'	Report	Newell 38'	Attendance: 19,469; Referee: D. Phillips

17 April 2012 44	Blackpool	1–0	Leeds United	Bloomfield Road
20:00	Ángel 79'	Report	O'Dea (red card) 86'	Attendance: 14,134; Referee: T. Bates

21 April 2012 45	Cardiff City	1–1	Leeds United	Cardiff City Stadium
12:30	Mason 41'	Report	Becchio 73'	Attendance: 25,109; Referee: M. Halsey

28 April 2012 46	Leeds United	1–2	Leicester City	Elland Road
12:30	Webber 82'	Report	Waghorn 39'; Panayiotou 90+4'	Attendance: 25,664; Referee: D. McDermid

=== FA Cup ===
9 January 2012 Third round	Arsenal	1–0	Leeds United	Emirates Stadium
19:45	Henry 78'; Arshavin (yellow card) 90+2'	Report	(yellow card) 43' O'Dea; (yellow card) 64' Townsend	Attendance: 59,615 (5,100 Leeds); Referee: M. Clattenburg

=== League Cup ===
9 August 2011 First round	Leeds United	3–2	Bradford City	Elland Road
19:45	Nunez 46', 75'; McCormack 70'	Report	Compton 31'; Flynn 57'	Attendance: 17,667; Referee: C. Webster

23 August 2011 Second round	Doncaster Rovers	1–2	Leeds United	Keepmoat Stadium
19:45	Hayter 2'	Report	Nunez 30', 83'	Attendance: 8,505; Referee: M. Brown

20 September 2011 Third round	Leeds United	0–3	Manchester United	Elland Road
19:45		Report	Owen 15', 32'; Giggs 45+1'	Attendance: 31,031; Referee: M. Jones

== First-team squad ==
=== Squad information ===
N	Pos.	Nat.	Name	Age	Since	App	Goals	Ends	Transfer fee	Notes
1	GK	(England)	Andy Lonergan	28	2011	38	0	2014	£200k	
2	DF	(England)	Paul Connolly	28	2010	63	0	2013	Free	
3	DF	(Australia)	Patrick Kisnorbo	31	2009	57	1	2013	Free	
4	DF	(England)	Alex Bruce	27	2010	34	1	2012	£300k	
5	DF	(Republic of Ireland) (England)	Andy O'Brien^{1}	32	2010	37	2	2013	Undisclosed	
6	MF	(United States)	Robbie Rogers	24	2012	4	0	2013	Free	
8	MF	(England)	Michael Brown	35	2011	26	1	2012	Free	
9	FW	(England)	Billy Paynter	27	2010	27	3	2013	Free	
10	FW	(Argentina)	Luciano Becchio	28	2008	190	67	2014	£300k	
11	MF	(Ghana) (England)	Lloyd Sam	27	2010	39	3	2012	Free	
12	GK	(England) (United States)	Paul Rachubka	30	2011	7	0	2013	Free	
15	MF	(England)	Adam Clayton	23	2010	49	6	2013	Undisclosed	
16	MF	(England)	Danny Pugh^{2}	29	2011; 2004	94	8	2014; 2006	£500k PX	
18	FW	(Finland)	Mikael Forssell	31	2011	17	0	2012	Free	
20	MF	(Honduras)	Ramón Núñez	26	2010	25	5	2015	Free	
22	DF	(England)	Tom Lees	21	2008	45	2	2015	Youth system	
23	FW	(Scotland)	Robert Snodgrass (captain)	24	2008	190	41	2013	£35k	
24	GK	(Northern Ireland) (Germany)	Maik Taylor	40	2011	0	0	2012	Free	
26	MF	(England)	Danny Webber	30	2012	13	1	2012	Free	
26	DF	(England)	Leigh Bromby	31	2009	64	1	2013	£250k	
27	FW	(South Africa)	Davide Somma	27	2009	34	12	2014	Free	
28	DF	(Republic of Ireland) (England)	Aidan White	20	2008	65	0	2012	Youth system	
29	DF	(England)	Zac Thompson	19	2011	11	0	2013	Free	
30	GK	(England)	Alex Cairns	19	2011	1	0	2014	Youth system	
31	DF	(England)	Charlie Taylor	18	2011	4	0	2014	Youth system	
32	DF	(England)	Lewis Turner	19	2011	0	0	2012	Youth system	
33	DF	(England)	Paul Robinson	33	2012	10	0	2012	Loan	
44	FW	(Scotland)	Ross McCormack	25	2010	70	21	2013	£350k	

- Last updated: 28 April 2012
- Source: Wikipedia players' articles,
- Ordered by Squad Number.

Appearances (starts and substitute appearances) and goals include those in The Championship (and playoffs), League One (and playoffs), FA Cup, League Cup and Football League Trophy.
^{1}Player first came to the club on loan and was transferred the following year.
^{2}Player made fifty eight appearances (scoring six goals) for the club during his first spell at the club

=== Squad stats ===
				Total				2011–12 Football League Championship		FA Cup		2011–12 Football League Cup		
N	Pos.	Name	Nat.	GS	App	Gls	Min	App	Gls	App	Gls	App	Gls	Notes
1	GK	Lonergan	(England)	31	31		2907	28		1		2		
2	RB	Connolly	(England)	23	25		2171	23				2		
3	CB	Kisnorbo	(Australia)	19	21		1773	19				2		
4	RB	Bruce	(Republic of Ireland) (England)	4	4		300	4						
5	CB	O'Brien	(Republic of Ireland) (England)	4	6		394	4				2		
6	AM	Rogers	(United States)		1		10	1						
8	DM	Brown	(England)	18	22	1	1608	20	1	1		1		
9	FW	Paynter	(England)		2	2	57	2	2					
10	FW	Becchio	(Argentina)	22	36	11	2305	34	11	1		1		
11	LW	Sam	(Ghana) (England)	5	19		782	17				2		Started several games at RW
12	GK	Rachubka	(England) (United States)	6	7		440	6				1		
15	CM	Clayton	(England)	40	41	6	3708	38	6	1		2		
16	LM	Pugh	(England)	26	29	2	2407	28	2	1				Started several games at LB
18	FW	Forssell	(Finland)	1	13		294	11		1		1		
20	LW	Núñez	(Honduras)	8	20	5	919	16	1	1		3	4	Started several games at AM
22	CB	Lees	(England)	35	38	2	3311	35	2	1		2		Started several games at RB
23	RW	Snodgrass	(Scotland)	35	37	13	3295	35	13			2		
24	GK	M. Taylor	(Northern Ireland) (Germany)											
25	FW	Webber	(England)	1	6	1	228	6	1					
26	CB	Bromby	(England)	4	7		395	5				2		
27	FW	Somma	(South Africa)											
28	LB	White	(Republic of Ireland) (England)	37	38		3229	35		1		2		Started several games at LW
29	RB	Thompson	(England)	6	8		601	6		1		1		Started several games at CM
30	GK	Cairns	(England)		1		47	1						
31	LB	C. Taylor	(England)	1	3		133	1				2		
32	LB	L. Turner	(England)											
33	LB	Robinson	(England)	4	4		365	4						
44	FW	McCormack	(Scotland)	38	42	19	3274	38	18	1		3	1	Started several games at LW
48	CB	O'Dea	(Republic of Ireland)	35	34	2	3241	31	2	1		2		Started several games at LB
Players who have been available for selection this season, but have now permanently left the club:
7	LW	Gradel	(Ivory Coast)	4	5	1	336	4	1			1		
7	AM	Väyrynen	(Finland)	3	12		357	10		1		1		
13	FW	Grella	(United States)											
14	CM	Howson	(England)	22	22	1	1981	19	1			3		
14	RB	Smith	(England)	3	3		261	3						
17	RW	Townsend	(England)	7	7	1	522	6	1	1				
19	LB	Parker	(England)	1	1		95					1		
21	LB	Bessone	(Argentina)											
21	GK	McCarthy	(England)	6	6		564	6						
25	CM	Delph	(England)	3	3		435	3						
38	FW	Keogh	(Republic of Ireland)	19	24	2	1524	22	2			2		

Last updated: 24 March 2012
Ordered by Squad Numbers
0 shown as blank

=== Disciplinary record ===
N	Pos.	Nat.	Name	Yellow card	Second yellow card	Red card	Notes
48	LB	(Republic of Ireland)	O'Dea	11	1		
15	CM	(England)	Clayton	12			
8	DM	(England)	Brown	7		1	
2	RB	(England)	Connolly	7	1		
23	RW	(Scotland)	Snodgrass	8			
16	LW	(England)	Pugh	6			
14	CM	(England)	Howson	4	1		
10	FW	(Argentina)	Becchio	5			
28	LB	(England)	White	3		1	
7	LW	(Ivory Coast)	Gradel	2	1		
3	CB	(Australia)	Kisnorbo	2		1	
44	FW	(Scotland)	McCormack	3			
33	LB	(England)	Robinson	3			
22	CB	(England)	Lees	1		1	
7	CM	(Finland)	Väyrynen	2			
29	CM	(England)	Thompson			1	
26	CB	(England)	Bromby	1			
38	FW	(Republic of Ireland)	Keogh	1			
1	GK	(England)	Lonergan	1			
5	CB	(Republic of Ireland)	O'Brien	1			
11	LW	(Ghana) (England)	Sam	1			
31	LB	(England)	C. Taylor	1			
17	RW	(England)	Townsend	1			

Last updated: 28 April 2012
Only competitive matches
(yellow card) = Number of bookings; (second yellow card) = Number of sending offs after a second yellow card; (red card) = Number of sending offs by a direct red card.

== Transfers ==
=== In ===
No.	Pos.	Nat.	Name	Age	EU	Moving from	Type	Transfer window	Ends	Transfer fee	Source
12	GK	(England) (United States)	Paul Rachubka	30	EU	Blackpool	Free Agent	Summer	2013	Free	
8	MF	(England)	Michael Brown	34	EU	Portsmouth	Free Agent	Summer	2012^{1}	Free	
1	GK	(England)	Andy Lonergan	27	EU	Preston North End	Transferred	Summer	2014	£200k^{2}	
18	FW	(Finland)	Mikael Forssell	30	EU	Hannover 96 (Germany)	Free Agent	Summer	2012	Free	
7	MF	(Finland)	Mika Väyrynen	29	EU	Heerenveen (Netherlands)	Free Agent	Summer	2012^{1}	Free	
24	GK	(Northern Ireland) (Germany)	Maik Taylor	40	EU	Birmingham City	Free Agent	Summer	2012	Free	
16	MF	(England)	Danny Pugh	29	EU	Stoke City	Transferred	Winter	2014	£500k	
6	MF	(United States)	Robbie Rogers	24	EU	Columbus Crew (United States)	Free Agent	Winter	2013	Free	
25	MF	(England)	Danny Webber	30	EU	Portsmouth	Free Agent	Winter	2012	Free	

^{1}Includes an option of the club extending the contract by one year.
^{2}Although the fee was officially 'undisclosed', the Yorkshire Evening Post confirmed that the fee was £200k

=== Loans in ===
No.	Pos.	Name	Country	Age	Loan club	Started	Ended	Start source	End source
48	DF	Darren O'Dea	(Republic of Ireland)	25	Celtic	4 Aug	20 Apr		
38	FW	Andy Keogh	(Republic of Ireland)	25	Wolverhampton Wanderers	15 Aug	2 Jan		
16	MF	Danny Pugh	(England)	29	Stoke City	22 Sep	2 Jan		
21	GK	Alex McCarthy	(England)	22	Reading	4 Nov	3 Jan		
17	MF	Andros Townsend	(England)	20	Tottenham Hotspur	1 Jan	23 Feb		
25	MF	Fabian Delph	(England)	22	Aston Villa	20 Jan	22 Feb		
14	DF	Adam Smith	(England)	20	Tottenham Hotspur	31 Jan	27 Feb		
33	DF	Paul Robinson	(England)	33	Bolton Wanderers	6 Mar	28 Apr		
—	GK	Sean McDermott	(Republic of Ireland) (Norway)	18	Arsenal	9 Mar	9 Apr		

Sources: For loan start source see "Start source". For loan end source see "End source".
EU = if holds or not a European Union passport; Country: when 2 flags, 1st flag = country that plays for internationally, 2nd flag = country of birth; No. = number on jersey; P = Position (for position name, pause mouse pointer on abbreviation); Name = Name on jersey (for more extensive name, pause mouse pointer on name); In/Out = In: The player came in on loan, Out: The player went out on loan; Loan club = the club that the player moved on loan to or the club that the player came from on loan; Started = the date when the player's loan started; Ended = the date when the player's loan ended.

=== Loans out ===
No.	Pos.	Name	Country	Age	Loan club	Started	Ended	Start source	End source
13	FW	Mike Grella	(United States)	24	Brentford	26 Aug	29 Aug		
—	MF	Will Hatfield	(England)	35	Accrington Stanley	14 Oct	31 Dec		
9	FW	Billy Paynter	(England)	27	Brighton & Hove Albion	27 Oct	2 Jan		
4	DF	Alex Bruce	(England)	42	Huddersfield Town	24 Oct	31 Dec		
12	GK	Paul Rachubka	(England) (United States)	30	Tranmere Rovers	14 Nov	30 Jan		
31	DF	Charlie Taylor	(England)	18	York City	1 Jan	30 Jan		
19	DF	Ben Parker	(England)	24	Carlisle United	26 Jan	25 Feb		
30	GK	Alex Cairns	(England)	19	Barrow	31 Jan	2 Mar		
12	GK	Paul Rachubka	(England) (United States)	45	Leyton Orient	7 Mar			
24	GK	Maik Taylor	(Northern Ireland) (Germany)	40	Millwall	12 Mar	28 Apr		
11	MF	Lloyd Sam	(Ghana) (England)	42	Notts County	14 Mar			

Sources: For loan start source see "Start source". For loan end source see "End source".
EU = if holds or not a European Union passport; Country: when 2 flags, 1st flag = country that plays for internationally, 2nd flag = country of birth; No. = number on jersey; P = Position (for position name, pause mouse pointer on abbreviation); Name = Name on jersey (for more extensive name, pause mouse pointer on name); In/Out = In: The player came in on loan, Out: The player went out on loan; Loan club = the club that the player moved on loan to or the club that the player came from on loan; Started = the date when the player's loan started; Ended = the date when the player's loan ended.

=== Out ===
No.	Pos.	Name	Country	Age	Type	Moving to	Transfer window	Transfer fee	Apps	Goals	Source
1	GK	Kasper Schmeichel	(Denmark)	24	Transferred	Leicester City	Summer	£1.0m^{1}	40	0	
—	MF	Elliot Kebbie	(England)	16	Out of Contract	Atlético Madrid (Spain)	Summer	£500k^{2}	0	0	
12	GK	Shane Higgs	(England)	34	Out of Contract	Northampton Town	Summer	n/a	29	0	
6	DF	Richard Naylor	(England)	34	Out of Contract	Doncaster Rovers	Summer	n/a	76	4	
—	MF	James Baxendale	(England)	18	Out of Contract	Doncaster Rovers	Summer	n/a	0	0	
—	DF	Jonny Birbeck	(England)	18	Out of Contract		Summer	n/a	0	0	
—	DF	James Booker	(England)	18	Out of Contract		Summer	n/a	0	0	
8	MF	Neil Kilkenny	(Australia) (England)	25	Out of Contract	Bristol City	Summer	n/a	144	11	
16	MF	Bradley Johnson	(England)	24	Out of Contract	Norwich City	Summer	n/a	140	17	
13	FW	Mike Grella	(United States)	24	Released	Brentford	Summer	n/a	42	5	
21	DF	Federico Bessone	(Argentina)	27	Released	Swansea City (Wales)	Summer	n/a	8	0	
7	MF	Max Gradel	(Ivory Coast)	23	Transferred	Saint-Étienne (France)	Summer	£1.7m^{1}	84	25	
—	MF	Will Hatfield	(England)	20	Released	Accrington Stanley	Winter	n/a	0	0	
14	MF	Jonathan Howson	(England)	23	Transferred	Norwich City	Winter	£2.0m^{1}	225	29	
19	DF	Ben Parker	(England)	24	Released	Guiseley	Winter	n/a	55	1	
7	MF	Mika Väyrynen	(Finland) (Sweden)	30	Released	HJK (Finland)	Winter	n/a	10	0	

EU = if holds or not a European Union passport; Country: when 2 flags, 1st flag = country that plays for internationally, 2nd flag = country of birth; N = number on jersey; P = Position (for position name, pause mouse pointer on abbreviation); Name = Name on jersey (for more extensive name, pause mouse pointer on name); Age = age on the day of the signing; Moving from = only indicate the club the player was playing before start playing for this club in this season, for the type of the moving see Status column; Moving to = only indicates the club the player is going to play next, for the type of the moving see Status column; Ends = when the player's current contract ends; n/a = Not applicable.
^{1}Although the fees were officially 'undisclosed', chairman Ken Bates confirmed that the Gradel fee was approximately £1,700,000, Schmeichel fee – £1,000,000 and Howson fee – £2,000,000
^{2}Despite being out of contract, Atletico Madrid were legally obliged to pay his former club an undisclosed fee which was later reported to be £500,000

=== New Contracts ===
No.	Pos.	Nat.	Name	Age	Status	Contract length	Expiry date	Source
20	MF	(Honduras)	Ramón Núñez	25	Signed	1 year	June 2012	
—	DF	(England)	Nathan Turner	18	Signed	1 year	June 2012	
32	MF	(England)	Lewis Turner	18	Signed	1 year	June 2012	
31	DF	(England)	Charlie Taylor	17	Signed	3 years	June 2014	
16	MF	(England)	Bradley Johnson	24	Rejected	Unknown	n/a	
—	DF	(Germany)	Monty Gimpel	17	Signed	1 year	June 2012	
30	GK	(England)	Alex Cairns	18	Signed	1 year^{1}	June 2012	
8	MF	(Australia) (England)	Neil Kilkenny	25	Rejected	Unknown	n/a	
22	DF	(England)	Tom Lees	20	Signed	4 years	June 2015	
20	MF	(Honduras)	Ramón Núñez	25	Signed	4 years^{1}	June 2015	
29	MF	(England)	Zac Thompson	18	Signed	2 years	June 2013	
28	MF	(England)	Aidan White	20	Rejected	4 years	n/a	
24	GK	(Northern Ireland) (Germany)	Maik Taylor	40	Signed	6 months	June 2012	
14	MF	(England)	Jonathan Howson	23	Rejected	Unknown	n/a	
30	GK	(England)	Alex Cairns	19	Signed	2 years	June 2014	

^{1}The contract includes the option to extend the contract by a further year.

== Awards ==
=== Internal Awards ===
==== Official Player of the Year Awards ====
The results of the 2011–12 Leeds United A.F.C. Player of the Year Awards were announced at a dinner on 30 April 2012 at Elland Road.

- Player of the Year: Robert Snodgrass
- Young Player of the Year: Tom Lees
- Players' Player of the Year: Robert Snodgrass
- Goal of the Season: Adam Clayton (vs Leicester City, 6 November)
- Fastest Goal of the Season: Adam Clayton (vs Bristol City, 17 September)
- Best Contribution to Community: Aidan White
- Chairman's Special Award: Neil Redfearn

=== External Awards ===
==== Championship Team of the Week ====
The following Leeds players have been selected in the official 2011–12 Championship team of the week.

- 23 August: Darren O'Dea
- 19 September: Adam Clayton
- 26 September: Ross McCormack
- 3 October: Danny Pugh
- 17 October: Tom Lees, Ross McCormack
- 5 December: Tom Lees, Danny Pugh, Robert Snodgrass
- 16 January: Andros Townsend
- 6 February: Robert Snodgrass
- 20 February: Adam Clayton
- 12 March: Andy Lonergan, Darren O'Dea
- 26 March: Andy Lonergan
- 16 April: Tom Lees
