= 2013–14 Leeds United F.C. season =

2013–14 season of Leeds United

Leeds United
2013–14 season
- Chairman: Ken Bates (until 1 July); Salah Nooruddin
- Manager: Brian McDermott
- Stadium: Elland Road
- Championship: 15th
- FA Cup: Third round
- League Cup: Third round
- Top goalscorer: League: Ross McCormack (28); All: Ross McCormack (29)
- Highest home attendance: 33,432 vs Brighton & Hove Albion (3 August 2013, Championship)
- Lowest home attendance: 17,343 vs Charlton Athletic (1 April 2014, Championship)
- Average home league attendance: 25,088
Home colours	Away colours

The 2013–14 season saw Leeds United competing in the Championship (known as the Sky Bet Championship for sponsorship reasons) for a fourth successive season.

== Season summary ==
Leeds began the season in the same strong form that helped them avoid relegation the previous year, and by Christmas Day were in the play-off places, leaving fans cautiously optimistic that Brian McDermott might be the man to take them back into the top-flight after a decade away. As had become all-too familiar for the club, however, off-field events saw their promotion challenge quickly unravel. GFH Capital, who had purchased the club the previous year, announced that they did not have the funds to continue running the club long-term, and eventually sold Leeds to maverick Italian owner Massimo Cellino, who immediately ran afoul of the Football Association's fit and proper persons test due to a past criminal conviction.

The uncertainty had a clear effect on the field, with Leeds' form collapsing dramatically, eventually leading to a farcial episode where McDermott was sacked, only to be reinstated a few days later. The team won only three games in-between Christmas Day and April 8, before a late flurry of ten points from their final five matches stabilized their league position (though they would have survived even had they not gained any points from these games, largely thanks to the dismal form of the bottom four sides). However, this was not enough to save McDermott's job, and he parted company with Leeds shortly after the season ended, with club captain Ross McCormack, whose goals were largely credited with helping Leeds avoid a serious relegation struggle, handing in a transfer request shortly thereafter.

== Events ==
This is a list of the significant events to occur at the club during the 2013–14 season, presented in chronological order, starting on 4 May 2013 and ending on the final day of the club's final match in the 2013–14 season. This list does not include transfers or new contracts, which are listed in the transfers section below, or match results, which are in the results section.

=== August ===
- 11 August: Rodolph Austin replaces Lee Peltier as Club Captain.

=== October ===
- 21 October: Ryan Hall is suspended from the club for two weeks pending an investigation into a disciplinary issue

=== November ===
- 30 November: English consortium granted exclusive period for significant investment in club by GFH Capital.

=== January ===
- 7 January: The club confirms the group which will acquire a majority shareholding in Leeds United is Sport Capital.
- 10 January: Leeds United announce strategic partnership with San Francisco 49ers of the NFL.
- 16 January: Ross McCormack is named as new Club Captain, replacing Rodolph Austin, who was appointed club captain at the start of the season – who stepped down from the role following the 6–0 defeat against Sheffield Wednesday.
- 30 January: The takeover of Sport Capital collapses after some of the consortium's backers didn't feel able to deliver the financial backing.
  However, GFH Capital confirm they are in continual discussions regarding the introduction of new investment into Leeds United.

=== February ===
- 1 February 2014: GFH Capital confirm that it has agreed to sell a 75 per cent stake in the club to Eleonora Sport, a company owned by Massimo Cellino.
- 4 February 2014: Enterprise Insurance, the club's shirt sponsor, file a winding-up petition over an alleged unpaid debt understood to be about £1.5 million.
- 7 February 2014: GFH Capital exchanged contracts for the sale of 75 per cent of the club to Eleonora Sport, subject to Football League approval. GFH Capital and its investors will retain a 25 per cent stake in Leeds United.
- 27 February 2014: Enterprise Insurance withdraw winding-up petition after the club are understood to have repaid around £1.6 million to Enterprise Insurance, with the hearing at the High Court on 17 March cancelled.

=== March ===
- 24 March 2014: After Massimo Cellino was found to be guilty of an offence under Italian tax legislation to the non-payment of import duties of a boat, The Football League disqualified Cellino from taking over the club. Leeds United's Board and Executive Management announced they will continue discussions with the Football League and Eleonora Sport to find a solution that is suitable to all parties.
- 27 March 2014: The legal representatives of Massimo Cellino lodged an appeal against The Football League’s decision that he is subject to a disqualifying condition under its Owners’ and Directors’ Test.
- 28 March 2014: After the club failed to pay the players on time, the Leeds United players agreed to defer part of their wages for March.

=== April ===
- 5 April 2014: After an independent Queen's Counsel overturned the decision made by The Football League to disqualify Massimo Cellino, Massimo Cellino was granted approval to complete the purchase of a majority stake in Leeds United, subject to FL Approval. The approval will see Eleonora Sport take a 75% stakeholding in the club while former majority shareholders GFH Capital and investors retain 25%.
- 8 April 2014: Leeds United post £9.5 million loss for the 2012–13 financial year. Massimo Cellino completes his takeover of Leeds United having agreed a deal to buy a 75% stake in the club, according to his lawyers.
- 10 April 2014: The Football League ratified Massimo Cellino's takeover of Leeds United, allowing Cellino to become a Director of the club.
- 11 April 2014: David Haigh resigns as Managing Director.

=== May ===
- 3 May 2014: Leeds United finish the 2013–14 Championship season 15th, on 57 points.

== Pre-season ==
6 July 2013	Farsley	0–5	Leeds United	Farsley
15:00 BST		Report	Poleon 4'; Smith 22', 27'; Hunt 50'; White 62'	Stadium: Throstle Nest

10 July 2013	Slovenian XI	1–3	Leeds United	Murska Sobota, Slovenia
17:00 BST	Grah 69'	Report	Smith 10'; Hunt 40'; Poleon 66'	Stadium: Fazanerija City Stadium

13 July 2013	Domžale	2–1	Leeds United	Domžale, Slovenia
18:45 BST	Vuk 79', 89'	Report	Poleon 27'	Stadium: Domžale Sports Park

16 July 2013	Ferencváros	1–0	Leeds United	Murska Sobota, Slovenia
17:00 BST	Böde 52'	Report		Stadium: Fazanerija City Stadium

20 July 2013	Walsall	1–0	Leeds United	Walsall
15:00 BST	Westcarr 11'	Report		Stadium: Bescot Stadium; Attendance: 3,900; Referee: Oliver Langford

23 July 2013	Stevenage	0–3	Leeds United	Stevenage
19:45 BST		Report	Varney 70', 76', 80' (pen.)	Stadium: Broadhall Way; Attendance: 2,751; Referee: Michael Russell

27 July 2013	Leeds United	0–2	1. FC Nürnberg	Leeds
15:00 BST		Report	Ginczek 3', 70'	Stadium: Elland Road; Attendance: 9,455; Referee: Andy Haines

29 July 2013	Shelbourne	0–4	Leeds United XI	Dublin, Republic of Ireland
19:45 BST		Report	Hunt 15'; Hall 28', 79'; Killock 59'	Stadium: Tolka Park; Attendance: 2,177

== Competitions ==
=== Overall summary ===
Competition	Started round	Final position / round	First match	Last match
Football League Championship	—	15th	3 August 2013	3 May 2014
League Cup	First round	Third round	7 August 2013	25 September 2013
FA Cup	Third round	Third round	4 January 2014	4 January 2014

Updated to match played 3 May 2014
Source: Competitions

=== Championship ===
==== League table ====
Pos	Team	Pld	W	D	L	GF	GA	GD	Pts
13	Watford	46	15	15	16	74	64	+10	60
14	Bolton Wanderers	46	14	17	15	59	60	−1	59
15	Leeds United	46	16	9	21	59	67	−8	57
16	Sheffield Wednesday	46	13	14	19	63	65	−2	53
17	Huddersfield Town	46	14	11	21	58	65	−7	53

Source: BBC Sport
Rules for classification: 1) points; 2) goal difference; 3) number of goals scored

==== Results summary ====
Overall								Home						Away					
Pld	W	D	L	GF	GA	GD	Pts	W	D	L	GF	GA	GD	W	D	L	GF	GA	GD
46	16	9	21	59	67	−8	57	9	5	9	35	31	+4	7	4	12	24	36	−12

Last updated: 3 May 2014.
Source: The Football League

==== Results by round ====
Round	1	2	3	4	5	6	7	8	9	10	11	12	13	14	15	16	17	18	19	20	21	22	23	24	25	26	27	28	29	30	31	32	33	34	35	36	37	38	39	40	41	42	43	44	45	46
Ground	H	A	H	A	H	A	A	H	A	H	A	H	A	H	A	H	A	H	H	A	H	A	A	H	A	H	H	H	A	A	A	A	H	H	A	H	A	H	H	A	A	H	A	H	A	H
Result	W	D	D	W	L	W	L	L	L	W	L	W	L	W	W	W	L	W	D	W	D	D	L	L	L	L	D	W	W	L	D	D	L	L	L	W	L	L	L	L	L	W	W	L	W	D
Position	4	8	9	5	10	6	11	12	15	11	14	9	10	8	8	6	8	7	8	6	5	6	7	8	11	12	12	11	10	11	11	12	12	15	14	13	14	15	15	16	16	16	16	16	15	15

Updated to match(es) played on 3 May 2014. Source: Competitive Matches
A = Away; H = Home; W = Win; D = Draw; L = Loss

==== Matches ====
3 August 2013 1	Leeds United	2–1	Brighton & Hove Albion	Leeds
15:00 BST	McCormack 18'; Murphy 90+4'	Report	Ulloa 13'	Stadium: Elland Road; Attendance: 33,432; Referee: James Adcock

11 August 2013 2	Leicester City	0–0	Leeds United	Leicester
16:30 BST		Report		Stadium: King Power Stadium; Attendance: 22,725; Referee: Keith Stroud

17 August 2013 3	Leeds United	1–1	Sheffield Wednesday	Leeds
12:15 BST	McCormack 58'	Report	Zayatte 36'	Stadium: Elland Road; Attendance: 23,766; Referee: Roger East

24 August 2013 4	Ipswich Town	1–2	Leeds United	Ipswich
15:00 BST	McGoldrick 12'	Report	Varney 28'; McCormack 49'	Stadium: Portman Road; Attendance: 18,322; Referee: Mike Dean

31 August 2013 5	Leeds United	0–1	Queens Park Rangers	Leeds
12:15 BST		Report	Hill 75'	Stadium: Elland Road; Attendance: 23,341; Referee: Stuart Attwell

14 September 2013 6	Bolton Wanderers	0–1	Leeds United	Bolton
15:00 BST		Report	Varney 6'	Stadium: Reebok Stadium; Attendance: 19,622; Referee: Andy D'Urso

18 September 2013 7	Reading	1–0	Leeds United	Reading
20:00 BST	Le Fondre 90+6'	Report		Stadium: Madejski Stadium; Attendance: 21,167; Referee: Neil Swarbrick

21 September 2013 8	Leeds United	1–2	Burnley	Leeds
15:00 BST	Smith 79'	Report	Arfield 18'; Vokes 41'	Stadium: Elland Road; Attendance: 26,465; Referee: Lee Probert

28 September 2013 9	Millwall	2–0	Leeds United	Bermondsey
15:00 BST	Woolford 65'; Malone 76'	Report		Stadium: The Den; Attendance: 13,063; Referee: Chris Foy

1 October 2013 10	Leeds United	2–1	Bournemouth	Leeds
19:45 BST	McCormack 52'; Poleon 80'	Report	Grabban 73'	Stadium: Elland Road; Attendance: 21,749; Referee: David Coote

5 October 2013 11	Derby County	3–1	Leeds United	Derby
15:00 BST	Martin 20'; Russell 22'; Hughes 78'	Report	Pearce 45'	Stadium: Pride Park Stadium; Attendance: 26,204; Referee: Geoff Eltringham

20 October 2013 12	Leeds United	4–0	Birmingham City	Leeds
13:15 BST	McCormack 18'; Austin 33'; Smith 45', 74'	Report		Stadium: Elland Road; Attendance: 21,301; Referee: Paul Tierney

26 October 2013 13	Huddersfield Town	3–2	Leeds United	Huddersfield
12:30 BST	Ward 9'; Lees 63' (o.g.); Stead 77'	Report	Smith 1'; Blackstock 73'	Stadium: Kirklees Stadium; Attendance: 18,309; Referee: Neil Swarbrick

2 November 2013 14	Leeds United	2–0	Yeovil Town	Leeds
15:00 GMT	McCormack 48', 67'	Report		Stadium: Elland Road; Attendance: 25,351; Referee: Richard Clark

9 November 2013 15	Charlton Athletic	2–4	Leeds United	Charlton
15:30 GMT	Stewart 45'; Jackson 70'	Report	McCormack 17', 47' (pen.), 73', 90+1'	Stadium: The Valley; Attendance: 17,601; Referee: Keith Stroud

23 November 2013 16	Leeds United	2–1	Middlesbrough	Leeds
15:00 GMT	McCormack 35'; Pearce 57'	Report	Carayol 53'	Stadium: Elland Road; Attendance: 30,367; Referee: Philip Gibbs

30 November 2013 17	Blackburn Rovers	1–0	Leeds United	Blackburn
15:00 GMT	Spurr 45+2'	Report		Stadium: Ewood Park; Attendance: 20,267; Referee: Craig Pawson

4 December 2013 18	Leeds United	2–0	Wigan Athletic	Leeds
19:45 GMT	McCormack 15', 77'	Report		Stadium: Elland Road; Attendance: 25,888; Referee: Graham Scott

7 December 2013 19	Leeds United	3–3	Watford	Leeds
15:00 GMT	Pugh 50'; Smith 56'; McCormack 78'	Report	Deeney 14', 86'; Battocchio 45+1'	Stadium: Elland Road; Attendance: 23,445; Referee: Trevor Kettle

14 December 2013 20	Doncaster Rovers	0–3	Leeds United	Doncaster
15:00 GMT		Report	Smith 18'; McCormack 76'; Austin 88'	Stadium: Keepmoat Stadium; Attendance: 12,192; Referee: Phil Dowd

21 December 2013 21	Leeds United	0–0	Barnsley	Leeds
15:00 GMT		Report		Stadium: Elland Road; Attendance: 31,031; Referee: Keith Stroud

26 December 2013 22	Blackpool	1–1	Leeds United	Blackpool
17:15 GMT	Ince 65'	Report	Peltier 25'	Stadium: Bloomfield Road; Attendance: 15,552; Referee: Scott Mathieson

29 December 2013 23	Nottingham Forest	2–1	Leeds United	Nottingham
15:00 GMT	Halford 24'; Derbyshire 84'	Report	McCormack 83'	Stadium: City Ground; Attendance: 26,854; Referee: James Linington

1 January 2014 24	Leeds United	1–2	Blackburn Rovers	Leeds
15:00 GMT	Smith 53'	Report	Rhodes 12'; Gestede 37'	Stadium: Elland Road; Attendance: 30,145; Referee: Anthony Taylor

11 January 2014 25	Sheffield Wednesday	6–0	Leeds United	Sheffield
12:15 GMT	R. Johnson 20'; Nuhiu 45'; Wickham 50'; Maguire 67'; Lavery 80', 90+4'	Report		Stadium: Hillsborough; Attendance: 21,224; Referee: Lee Probert

18 January 2014 26	Leeds United	0–1	Leicester City	Leeds
12:15 GMT		Report	Nugent 87'	Stadium: Elland Road; Attendance: 22,678; Referee: Mike Dean

28 January 2014 27	Leeds United	1–1	Ipswich Town	Leeds
19:45 GMT	McCormack 62' (pen.)	Report	McGoldrick 57'	Stadium: Elland Road; Attendance: 20,461; Referee: David Webb

1 February 2014 28	Leeds United	5–1	Huddersfield Town	Leeds
15:00 GMT	McCormack 45+2', 62', 73'; Kébé 50'; Mowatt 82'	Report	Ward 25'	Stadium: Elland Road; Attendance: 31,103; Referee: Graham Salisbury

8 February 2014 29	Yeovil Town	1–2	Leeds United	Yeovil
12:15 GMT	Miller 32'	Report	McCormack 47'; Warnock 62'	Stadium: Huish Park; Attendance: 7,984; Referee: Paul Tierney

11 February 2014 30	Brighton & Hove Albion	1–0	Leeds United	Brighton
19:45 GMT	Ulloa 64'	Report		Stadium: Falmer Stadium; Attendance: 27,700; Referee: Darren Deadman

22 February 2014 31	Middlesbrough	0–0	Leeds United	Middlesbrough
12:15 GMT		Report		Stadium: Riverside Stadium; Attendance: 20,424; Referee: Anthony Taylor

1 March 2014 32	Queens Park Rangers	1–1	Leeds United	Shepherd's Bush
12:15 GMT	Jenas 44'	Report	McCormack 14'	Stadium: Loftus Road; Attendance: 16,448; Referee: Chris Foy

8 March 2014 33	Leeds United	1–5	Bolton Wanderers	Leeds
15:00 GMT	Smith 90'	Report	Mason 45'; Jutkiewicz 52'; Knight 56'; Davies 72'; Moritz 89'	Stadium: Elland Road; Attendance: 28,904; Referee: Keith Hill

11 March 2014 34	Leeds United	2–4	Reading	Leeds
20:15 GMT	Smith 63'; Austin 64'	Report	McCleary 25'; Drenthe 46'; Blackman 48'; Robson-Kanu 55'	Stadium: Elland Road; Attendance: 19,915; Referee: Oliver Langford

15 March 2014 35	Burnley	2–1	Leeds United	Burnley
15:00 GMT	Pearce 38' (o.g.); Arfield 68'	Report	McCormack 27'	Stadium: Turf Moor; Attendance: 18,109; Referee: Simon Hooper

22 March 2014 36	Leeds United	2–1	Millwall	Leeds
15:00 GMT	Smith 19'; McCormack 41'	Report	Campbell 72'	Stadium: Elland Road; Attendance: 23,211; Referee: Stuart Attwell

25 March 2014 37	Bournemouth	4–1	Leeds United	Bournemouth
19:45 GMT	Kermonrgant 2', 51'; Grabban 18', 28'	Report	McCormack 69'	Stadium: Dean Court; Attendance: 10,109; Referee: James Adcock

29 March 2014 38	Leeds United	1–2	Doncaster Rovers	Leeds
15:00 GMT	McCormack 62'	Report	Cotterill 23'; Sharp 45+1'	Stadium: Elland Road; Attendance: 23,476; Referee: Darren Bond

1 April 2014 39	Leeds United	0–1	Charlton Athletic	Leeds
19:45 BST		Report	Ghoochannejhad 55'	Stadium: Elland Road; Attendance: 17,343; Referee: Scott Duncan

5 April 2014 40	Wigan Athletic	1–0	Leeds United	Wigan
12:15 BST	Waghorn 33'	Report		Stadium: DW Stadium; Attendance: 16,443; Referee: Neil Swarbrick

8 April 2014 41	Watford	3–0	Leeds United	Watford
19:45 BST	Abdi 9'; Anya 32'; Deeney 66'	Report		Stadium: Vicarage Road; Attendance: 16,212; Referee: Gavin Ward

12 April 2014 42	Leeds United	2–0	Blackpool	Leeds
15:07 BST	Murphy 21', 73'	Report		Stadium: Elland Road; Attendance: 23,416; Referee: David Coote

19 April 2014 43	Barnsley	0–1	Leeds United	Barnsley
15:00 BST		Report	McCormack 16'	Stadium: Oakwell; Attendance: 15,190; Referee: David Webb

21 April 2014 44	Leeds United	0–2	Nottingham Forest	Leeds
17:15 BST		Report	Derbyshire 2', 16'	Stadium: Elland Road; Attendance: 20,517; Referee: Iain Williamson

26 April 2014 45	Birmingham City	1–3	Leeds United	Birmingham
15:00 BST	Macheda 83'	Report	Smith 57'; Pugh 60'; Caddis 78' (o.g.)	Stadium: St Andrew's; Attendance: 19,861; Referee: Geoff Eltringham

3 May 2014 46	Leeds United	1–1	Derby County	Leeds
12:15 BST	Smith 50'	Report	Dawkins 6'	Stadium: Elland Road; Attendance: 29,724; Referee: James Linington

=== FA Cup ===
4 January 2014 3	Rochdale	2–0	Leeds United	Rochdale
15:00 GMT	Hogan 45'; Henderson 84'	Report		Stadium: Spotland Stadium; Attendance: 8,225; Referee: Michael Jones

=== League Cup ===
7 August 2013 1	Leeds United	2–1	Chesterfield	Leeds
19:45 BST	Brown 28'; Poleon 31'	Report	Doyle 18'	Stadium: Elland Road; Attendance: 17,466; Referee: Carl Boyeson

27 August 2013 2	Doncaster Rovers	1–3	Leeds United	Doncaster
19:45 BST	Paynter 63'	Report	Wootton 41'; Smith 77'; McCormack 79' (pen.)	Stadium: Keepmoat Stadium; Attendance: 10,890; Referee: Scott Mathieson

25 September 2013 3	Newcastle United	2–0	Leeds United	Newcastle
19:45 BST	Cissé 31'; Gouffran 67'	Report		Stadium: St James' Park; Attendance: 36,220; Referee: Mike Jones

== First-team squad ==
=== Squad information ===
N	Pos.	Nat.	Name	Age	Since	App	Goals	Ends	Transfer fee	Notes
1	GK	(Republic of Ireland) (England)	Paddy Kenny	35	2012	81	0	2015	£400,000	
2	DF	(England)	Lee Peltier	27	2012	75	1	2015	£800,000	On loan to Nottingham Forest
3	DF	(England)	Adam Drury	35	2012	18	0	2014	Free	On loan to Bradford City
4	DF	(England)	Tom Lees	23	2008	135	4	2016	Youth system	
5	DF	(England)	Jason Pearce	26	2012	90	2	2016	£500,000	
6	MF	(England)	Luke Murphy	24	2013	40	3	2016	£1,000,000	
7	MF	(Republic of Ireland) (England)	Paul Green	31	2012	46	4	2014	Free	On loan to Ipswich Town
8	MF	(Jamaica)	Rodolph Austin	28	2012	82	7	2015	£300,000	
9	FW	(Wales) (England)	Steve Morison	30	2013 (Winter)	16	3	2016	PX	On loan to Millwall
10	FW	(Republic of Ireland)	Noel Hunt	31	2013	20	0	2015	Free	
11	FW	(England)	Luke Varney	31	2012	50	8	2014	£300,000	On loan to Blackburn Rovers
12	GK	(England)	Jamie Ashdown	31	2012	8	0	2014	Free	
14	MF	(Republic of Ireland) (England)	Aidan White	22	2008	110	2	2015	Youth system	
15	DF	(England)	Stephen Warnock	32	2013 (Winter)	45	2	2015	Free	
16	MF	(England)	Danny Pugh	31	2011; 2004	119 ^{1}	10	2014; 2006	£500,000; PX	
17	MF	(England)	Michael Brown	37	2011	79	3	2014	Free	
18	MF	(England)	Michael Tonge	31	2012	64	5	2015	£200,000	
19	MF	(England)	David Norris	33	2012	35	4	2015	Free	
20	FW	(England)	Matt Smith	24	2013	43	13	2015	Free	
21	FW	(Senegal)	El Hadji Diouf	33	2012	52	7	2014	Free	
22	DF	(England)	Scott Wootton	22	2013	23	1	2016	£1,000,000	
23	MF	(England)	Zac Thompson	21	2011 (Winter)	12	0	2015	Free	
24	DF	(Lithuania)	Marius Žaliūkas	30	2013	16	0	2015	Free	
25	DF	(England)	Sam Byram	20	2012	80	4	2016	Youth system	
26	FW	(England)	Dominic Poleon	20	2012	31	4	2015	Youth system	
27	MF	(United States)	Gboly Ariyibi	19	2013	2	0	2014	Free	On loan to Tranmere Rovers
28	MF	(England)	Cameron Stewart	23	2014 (Winter)	11	0	2014; 2017	Free	On loan from Hull City; Signing permanently in July 2014
29	MF	(England)	Simon Lenighan	19	2012	0	0	2014	Youth system	
30	GK	(England)	Jack Butland	21	2014 (Winter)	16	0	2014	N/A	On loan from Stoke City
31	DF	(England)	Charlie Taylor	20	2011	4	0	2014	Youth system	On loan to Fleetwood Town
32	MF	(Wales) (England)	Chris Dawson	19	2012	1	0	2016	Youth system	
33	GK	(England)	Alex Cairns	21	2011	1	0	2014	Youth system	
34	DF	(England)	Ross Killock	19	2012	0	0	2014	Youth system	
36	MF	(England)	Alex Mowatt	19	2013	31	1	2017	Youth system	
37	FW	(England)	Lewis Walters	19	2013	0	0	2015	Youth system	
44	FW	(Scotland)	Ross McCormack	27	2010	157	58	2017	£350,000	Club Captain

- Last updated: 3 May 2014
- Source: Wikipedia players' articles, Leeds United, Sky Sports
- Ordered by Squad Number.

Appearances (starts and substitute appearances) and goals include those in the Championship (and playoffs), League One (and playoffs), FA Cup, League Cup and Football League Trophy.
^{1}Player made fifty eight appearances (scoring six goals) for the club during his first spell at the club

=== Appearances and goals ===
As of 3 May 2014

No.	Pos	Nat	Player	Total		Championship		FA Cup		League Cup	
No.	Pos	Nat	Player	Apps	Goals	Apps	Goals	Apps	Goals	Apps	Goals
1	GK	(Republic of Ireland) IRL	Paddy Kenny	34	0	30+0	0	1+0	0	3+0	0
4	DF	(England) ENG	Tom Lees	42	0	40+1	0	0+0	0	1+0	0
5	DF	(England) ENG	Jason Pearce	49	2	45+0	2	1+0	0	3+0	0
6	MF	(England) ENG	Luke Murphy	40	3	37+0	3	1+0	0	0+2	0
8	MF	(Jamaica) JAM	Rodolph Austin	43	3	40+0	3	1+0	0	2+0	0
10	FW	(Republic of Ireland) IRL	Noel Hunt	20	0	13+6	0	0+1	0	0+0	0
12	GK	(England) ENG	Jamie Ashdown	0	0	0+0	0	0+0	0	0+0	0
14	MF	(Republic of Ireland) IRL	Aidy White	11	0	2+7	0	0+0	0	1+1	0
15	DF	(England) ENG	Stephen Warnock	28	1	27+0	1	0+0	0	1+0	0
16	MF	(England) ENG	Danny Pugh	21	2	19+1	2	1+0	0	0+0	0
17	MF	(England) ENG	Michael Brown	19	1	12+6	0	0+0	0	1+0	1
18	MF	(England) ENG	Michael Tonge	24	0	15+7	0	0+0	0	2+0	0
19	MF	(England) ENG	David Norris	1	0	0+0	0	0+0	0	1+0	0
20	FW	(England) ENG	Matt Smith	43	13	20+19	12	1+0	0	3+0	1
21	FW	(Senegal) SEN	El Hadji Diouf	7	0	2+4	0	0+0	0	0+1	0
22	DF	(England) ENG	Scott Wootton	23	1	19+1	0	1+0	0	2+0	1
23	MF	(England) ENG	Zac Thompson	1	0	0+0	0	0+0	0	1+0	0
24	DF	(Lithuania) LTU	Marius Žaliūkas	16	0	13+2	0	1+0	0	0+0	0
25	DF	(England) ENG	Sam Byram	27	0	17+8	0	1+0	0	1+0	0
26	FW	(England) ENG	Dominic Poleon	23	2	2+17	1	0+1	0	3+0	1
28	MF	(England) ENG	Cameron Stewart	11	0	9+2	0	0+0	0	0+0	0
29	MF	(England) ENG	Simon Lenighan	0	0	0+0	0	0+0	0	0+0	0
30	GK	(England) ENG	Jack Butland	16	0	16+0	0	0+0	0	0+0	0
32	MF	(Wales) WAL	Chris Dawson	0	0	0+0	0	0+0	0	0+0	0
33	GK	(England) ENG	Alex Cairns	0	0	0+0	0	0+0	0	0+0	0
34	DF	(England) ENG	Ross Killock	0	0	0+0	0	0+0	0	0+0	0
36	MF	(England) ENG	Alex Mowatt	31	1	24+5	1	0+0	0	2+0	0
37	MF	(England) ENG	Lewis Walters	0	0	0+0	0	0+0	0	0+0	0
44	FW	(Scotland) SCO	Ross McCormack	50	29	46+0	28	1+0	0	2+1	1
Players currently out on loan:
2	DF	(England) ENG	Lee Peltier	27	1	23+2	1	1+0	0	1+0	0
3	DF	(England) ENG	Adam Drury	3	0	0+1	0	0+0	0	2+0	0
7	MF	(Republic of Ireland) IRL	Paul Green	10	0	7+2	0	0+0	0	1+0	0
9	FW	(Wales) WAL	Steve Morison	0	0	0+0	0	0+0	0	0+0	0
11	FW	(England) ENG	Luke Varney	11	2	11+0	2	0+0	0	0+0	0
27	MF	(United States) USA	Gboly Ariyibi	2	0	0+2	0	0+0	0	0+0	0
31	DF	(England) ENG	Charlie Taylor	0	0	0+0	0	0+0	0	0+0	0
Players who have been available for selection this season, but have now permanently left the club:
9	FW	(Antigua and Barbuda) ANT	Dexter Blackstock	4	1	2+2	1	0+0	0	0+0	0
9	FW	(England) ENG	Connor Wickham	5	0	5+0	0	0+0	0	0+0	0
30	MF	(England) ENG	Ryan Hall	0	0	0+0	0	0+0	0	0+0	0
38	MF	(Mali) MLI	Jimmy Kébé	9	1	9+0	1	0+0	0	0+0	0

== Transfers ==
=== In ===
No.	Pos.	Nat.	Name	Age	EU	Moving from	Type	Transfer window	Ends	Transfer fee	Source
20	FW	(England)	Matt Smith	24	EU	Oldham Athletic	Transfer	Summer	2015	Free	
6	MF	(England)	Luke Murphy	23	EU	Crewe Alexandra	Transfer	Summer	2016	£1,000,000	
10	FW	(Republic of Ireland)	Noel Hunt	30	EU	Reading	Transfer	Summer	2015	Free	
22	DF	(England)	Scott Wootton	21	EU	Manchester United	Transfer	Summer	2016	£1,000,000	
24	DF	(Lithuania)	Marius Žaliūkas	29	EU	Heart of Midlothian (Scotland)	Transfer	Summer	2014	Free	
27	MF	(United States)	Gboly Ariyibi	18	Non-EU	Southampton	Transfer	Summer	2014	Free	
—	FW	(Northern Ireland)	Robbie McDaid	17	EU	Glenavon (Northern Ireland)	Transfer	Winter	2016	Free	

=== Loans in ===
No.	Pos.	Name	Country	Age	Loan club	Started	Ended	Start source	End source
9	FW	Dexter Blackstock	(Antigua and Barbuda) (England)	27	Nottingham Forest	24 Oct	10 Dec		
28	MF	Cameron Stewart	(England)	23	Hull City	9 Jan	1 May		
38	MF	Jimmy Kébé	(Mali) (France)	30	Crystal Palace	10 Jan	1 May		
30	GK	Jack Butland	(England)	21	Stoke City	20 Feb	5 May		
9	FW	Connor Wickham	(England)	20	Sunderland	26 Feb	24 March		

Sources: For loan start source see "Start source". For loan end source see "End source".
EU = if holds or not a European Union passport; Country: when 2 flags, 1st flag = country that plays for internationally, 2nd flag = country of birth; No. = number on jersey; P = Position (for position name, pause mouse pointer on abbreviation); Name = Name on jersey (for more extensive name, pause mouse pointer on name); In/Out = In: The player came in on loan, Out: The player went out on loan; Loan club = the club that the player moved on loan to or the club that the player came from on loan; Started = the date when the player's loan started; Ended = the date when the player's loan ended.

=== Loans out ===
No.	Pos.	Name	Country	Age	Loan club	Started	Ended	Start source	End source
9	FW	Steve Morison	(Wales) (England)	30	Millwall	28 Jun	31 May		
—	DF	Lewis Turner	(England)	20	Chester	1 Aug	27 Apr		
—	MF	Nathan Turner	(England)	20	Chester	1 Aug	27 Apr		
30	MF	Ryan Hall	(England)	25	Sheffield United	20 Sep	19 Oct		
31	DF	Charlie Taylor	(England)	20	Fleetwood Town	15 Oct	31 May		
34	DF	Ross Killock	(England)	19	Chester	24 Oct	27 Mar		
29	MF	Simon Lenighan	(England)	19	Bradford Park Avenue	28 Oct	23 Nov		
14	MF	Aidan White	(Republic of Ireland) (England)	22	Sheffield United	29 Oct	27 Dec		
—	FW	Luke Parkin	(England)	18	Guiseley	19 Dec	19 Jan		
7	MF	Paul Green	(Republic of Ireland) (England)	31	Ipswich Town	8 Feb	11 May		
11	FW	Luke Varney	(England)	31	Blackburn Rovers	8 Feb	11 May		
29	MF	Simon Lenighan	(England)	19	Halifax Town	11 Feb	8 Mar		
3	DF	Adam Drury	(England)	35	Bradford City	7 Mar	5 May		
2	DF	Lee Peltier	(England)	27	Nottingham Forest	24 Mar	24 May		
27	MF	Gboly Ariyibi	(United States)	19	Tranmere Rovers	25 Mar	25 May		

Sources: For loan start source see "Start source". For loan end source see "End source".
EU = if holds or not a European Union passport; Country: when 2 flags, 1st flag = country that plays for internationally, 2nd flag = country of birth; No. = number on jersey; P = Position (for position name, pause mouse pointer on abbreviation); Name = Name on jersey (for more extensive name, pause mouse pointer on name); In/Out = In: The player came in on loan, Out: The player went out on loan; Loan club = the club that the player moved on loan to or the club that the player came from on loan; Started = the date when the player's loan started; Ended = the date when the player's loan ended.

=== Out ===
No.	Pos.	Name	Country	Age	Type	Moving to	Transfer window	Transfer fee	Apps	Goals	Source
—	DF	Leigh Bromby	(England)	33	Out of contract	Retired	Summer	n/a	62	1	
24	DF	Paul Connolly	(England)	29	Out of contract	Millwall	Summer	n/a	63	0	
28	FW	Davide Somma	(South Africa)	28	Out of contract		Summer	n/a	40	13	
6	DF	Patrick Kisnorbo	(Australia)	32	Out of contract	Melbourne Heart (Australia)	Summer	n/a	58	1	
31	GK	Paul Rachubka	(England) (United States)	32	Out of contract	Oldham Athletic	Summer	n/a	7	0	
27	MF	Sanchez Payne	(England)	20	Out of contract	Stockport County	Summer	n/a	0	0	
30	MF	Ryan Hall	(England)	25	Released	Bromley	Summer	n/a	9	0	

EU = if holds or not a European Union passport; Country: when 2 flags, 1st flag = country that plays for internationally, 2nd flag = country of birth; N = number on jersey; P = Position (for position name, pause mouse pointer on abbreviation); Name = Name on jersey (for more extensive name, pause mouse pointer on name); Age = age on the day of the signing; Moving from = only indicate the club the player was playing before start playing for this club in this season, for the type of the moving see Status column; Moving to = only indicates the club the player is going to play next, for the type of the moving see Status column; Ends = when the player's current contract ends; n/a = Not applicable.

=== New contracts ===
No.	Pos.	Nat.	Name	Age	Status	Contract length	Expiry date	Source
—	DF	(England)	Afolabi Coker	31	Signed	1 year^{1}	June 2015	
—	DF	(England)	Smith Tiesse	30	Signed	1 year^{1}	June 2015	
—	FW	(Republic of Ireland)	Eoghan Stokes	30	Signed	1 year^{1}	June 2015	
44	FW	(Scotland)	Ross McCormack	40	Signed	4 years	June 2017	
36	MF	(England)	Alex Mowatt	31	Signed	3½ years	June 2017	
24	DF	(Lithuania)	Marius Žaliūkas	43	Signed	1½ years	June 2015	

^{1}Contracts come into effect Summer 2014

== Awards ==
=== Internal Awards ===
==== Official Player of the Year Awards ====
The results of the 2013–14 Leeds United A.F.C. Player of the Year Awards were announced at a dinner on 3 May 2014 at Elland Road.

- Fans' Player of the Year: Ross McCormack
- Young Player of the Year: Alex Mowatt
- Players' Player of the Year: Ross McCormack
- Goal of the Season: Ross McCormack (vs Sheffield Wednesday, 17 August)
- Fastest Goal of the Season: Matt Smith (vs Huddersfield Town, 26 October)
- Community Player of the Year: Matt Smith
