= 2012–13 Leeds United F.C. season =

2012–13 football season

Leeds United
2012–13 season
- Chairman: Ken Bates
- Manager: Neil Warnock (until 1 April); Neil Redfearn (caretaker, until 12 April); Brian McDermott (from 12 April)
- Stadium: Elland Road
- Championship: 13th
- FA Cup: Fifth round
- League Cup: Quarter-finals
- Top goalscorer: League: Luciano Becchio (15); All: Luciano Becchio (19)
- Highest home attendance: 33,816 vs Chelsea (19 December 2012, League Cup)
- Lowest home attendance: 11,447 vs Birmingham City (5 January 2013, FA Cup)
- Average home league attendance: 21,572
| Home colours | Away colours |

The 2012–13 season saw Leeds United competing in the Championship (known as the npower Championship for sponsorship reasons) for a third successive season.

== Season summary ==
The manager's office was vacated in April by Neil Warnock after his promise of promotion appeared dead in the water, and the club actually on the fringes of the relegation battle. The club officials relieved him of his duties and after a brief period with caretaker manager Neil Redfearn in charge, appointed Brian McDermott as the club's eight manager in ten years. Pre-season saw a big change in the playing staff with no more than ten players departing Elland Road and twelve players brought in. New signing Lee Peltier became club captain after existing leader Robert Snodgrass departed for Norwich City in the summer and was joined in the winter by fan favourite Luciano Becchio – both transfers much to the chagrin of the supporters. With Becchio gone, the club's top scorers were last year's star Ross McCormack with eight goals and controversial winger El Hadji Diouf with seven who Warnock picked up on a free transfer at the start of the season. Academy product Sam Byram would be the surprise of the season making his debut in the first game of the year and going on to scoop all the major awards at both the official, supporters' and Yorkshire Post's Player of the Year Awards. Other youngsters to take the field included Dominic Poleon who managed two goals and Chris Dawson who has since been awarded a three-year professional contract.

The talk of the season though was undoubtedly the protracted takeover of the club. The eight month, £52m takeover by Bahrain based GFH Capital saw the investment bank secure 100% shares of the club's parent company with four of its party joining the board of directors. In March, GFH would sell a 10% stake to the International Investment Bank and announced the company were looking for additional investors to boost the club's finances. The takeover would seemingly inject morale into the supporters with the club's short term finances secured and higher value incoming transfers promised. GFH deputy-CEO David Haigh become the public face for the boardroom with departing chairman Ken Bates taking a step back with a promise of the title club president secured for the end of the season.

== Events ==
This is a list of the significant events to occur at the club during the 2012–13 season, presented in chronological order, starting on 29 April 2012 and ending on the final day of the club's final match in the 2012–13 season. This list does not include transfers or new contracts, which are listed in the transfers section below, or match results, which are in the matches section.

=== November ===
- 21 November: Middle East-based private equity group GFH Capital finalise a deal for a protracted takeover of Leeds.

=== December ===
- 21 December: GFH Capital officially become the new owners of Leeds after completing a takeover of the club.

=== January ===
- 24 January: Longest serving player and top goalscorer, Luciano Becchio, hands in a transfer request.

=== April ===
- 1 April: After a 1–2 home loss to Derby County, Manager Neil Warnock departs from Leeds United.
- 12 April: Leeds United appoint Brian McDermott as new manager.

=== May ===
- 4 May: Leeds United end the 2012–13 Championship season 13th, 7 points behind the playoffs and 7 points above the relegation zone.

== Pre-season ==
| 20 July 2012 | Farsley | 2–5 | Leeds United | Farsley |
| 19:45 BST | | Report | Gray 31', 35'; Rogers 36'; Paynter 64'; Payne 89' | Stadium: Throstle Nest |

| 23 July 2012 | Tavistock | 0–6 | Leeds United | Tavistock |
| 19:00 BST | | Report | White 40'; Green 45'; Kinsman 61' (o.g.); Rogers 77'; Poleon 86'; Thompson 88' | Stadium: Langsford Park |

| 25 July 2012 | Bodmin Town | 0–4 | Leeds United | Bodmin |
| 19:00 BST | | Report | Varney 17'; Gray 41'; McCormack 45' (pen.); White 48' | Stadium: Priory Park |

| | Torquay United | 1–2 | Leeds United | Torquay |
| 19:00 BST | MacKenzie 75' | Report | McCormack 7'; McCormack 11' | Stadium: Plainmoor; Attendance: 3925 |

| 1 August 2012 | Sandefjord | 1–1 | Leeds United | Sandefjord |
| 18:00 BST | Klepaker 52' | Report | Pearce 17' | Stadium: Komplett.no Arena |

| 4 August 2012 | Preston North End | 1–3 | Leeds United | Preston |
| 19:00 BST | Mousinho 57' | Report | Lees 31'; Byram 66'; White 80' | Stadium: Deepdale |

| 7 August 2012 | Burton Albion | 0–1 | Leeds United | Burton upon Trent |
| 19:45 BST | | Report | Varney 27' | Stadium: Pirelli Stadium |

== Competitions ==
=== Overall summary ===
| Competition | Started round | Final position / round | First match | Last match |
|---|---|---|---|---|
| Football League Championship | — | 13th | 18 August 2012 | 4 May 2013 |
| League Cup | First round | Quarter-finals | 11 August 2012 | 19 December 2012 |
| FA Cup | Third round | Fifth round | 5 January 2013 | 17 February 2013 |

Updated to match played 4 May 2013
Source: Competitions

=== Championship ===
==== League table ====
| Pos | Team | Pld | W | D | L | GF | GA | GD | Pts |
|---|---|---|---|---|---|---|---|---|---|
| 11 | Burnley | 46 | 16 | 13 | 17 | 62 | 60 | +2 | 61 |
| 12 | Birmingham City | 46 | 15 | 16 | 15 | 63 | 69 | −6 | 61 |
| 13 | Leeds United | 46 | 17 | 10 | 19 | 57 | 66 | −9 | 61 |
| 14 | Ipswich Town | 46 | 16 | 12 | 18 | 48 | 61 | −13 | 60 |
| 15 | Blackpool | 46 | 14 | 17 | 15 | 62 | 63 | −1 | 59 |

Updated to match(es) played on 4 May 2013. Source: BBC Sport
Rules for classification: 1) points; 2) goal difference; 3) number of goals scored.

==== Results summary ====
| Overall | | | | | | | | Home | | | | | | Away | | | | | |
| Pld | W | D | L | GF | GA | GD | Pts | W | D | L | GF | GA | GD | W | D | L | GF | GA | GD |
|---|---|---|---|---|---|---|---|---|---|---|---|---|---|---|---|---|---|---|---|
| 46 | 17 | 10 | 19 | 57 | 66 | −9 | 61 | 13 | 3 | 7 | 30 | 26 | +4 | 4 | 7 | 12 | 27 | 40 | −13 |

Last updated: 4 May 2013.
Source: The Football League

==== Results by round ====
| Round | 1 | 2 | 3 | 4 | 5 | 6 | 7 | 8 | 9 | 10 | 11 | 12 | 13 | 14 | 15 | 16 | 17 | 18 | 19 | 20 | 21 | 22 | 23 | 24 | 25 | 26 | 27 | 28 | 29 | 30 | 31 | 32 | 33 | 34 | 35 | 36 | 37 | 38 | 39 | 40 | 41 | 42 | 43 | 44 | 45 | 46 |
|---|---|---|---|---|---|---|---|---|---|---|---|---|---|---|---|---|---|---|---|---|---|---|---|---|---|---|---|---|---|---|---|---|---|---|---|---|---|---|---|---|---|---|---|---|---|---|
| Ground | H | A | A | H | A | H | H | A | A | H | A | H | H | A | A | H | A | H | H | A | A | H | H | A | A | H | A | H | H | A | A | H | A | H | A | A | H | H | A | H | A | H | H | A | H | A |
| Result | W | L | W | D | L | L | W | W | D | W | D | D | L | D | L | L | L | W | W | W | L | W | W | L | L | W | L | W | L | D | L | W | D | W | D | D | D | L | L | L | L | W | W | L | L | W |
| Position | 5 | 14 | 7 | 7 | 9 | 13 | 11 | 9 | 9 | 7 | 6 | 7 | 11 | 10 | 15 | 17 | 18 | 16 | 15 | 10 | 14 | 12 | 8 | 9 | 9 | 8 | 11 | 11 | 12 | 11 | 11 | 9 | 9 | 9 | 10 | 10 | 10 | 10 | 11 | 12 | 16 | 11 | 11 | 13 | 16 | 13 |

Updated to match(es) played on 4 May 2013. Source: Competitive Matches
A = Away; H = Home; W = Win; D = Draw; L = Loss

Win Draw Loss Void

==== Matches ====
| 18 August 2012 1 | Leeds United | 1–0 | Wolverhampton Wanderers | Leeds |
| 15:00 BST | Becchio 17' | Report | | Stadium: Elland Road; Attendance: 23,745 (1,541 away fans); Referee: Anthony Bates |

| 21 August 2012 2 | Blackpool | 2–1 | Leeds United | Blackpool |
| 19:45 BST | Dicko 75'; M. Phillips 80' | Report | Lees 16' | Stadium: Bloomfield Road; Attendance: 14,315; Referee: Dean Whitestone |

| 25 August 2012 3 | Peterborough United | 1–2 | Leeds United | Peterborough |
| 15:00 BST | Bostwick 73' | Report | Becchio 7', 50' | Stadium: London Road; Attendance: 10,432; Referee: Scott Mathieson |

| 1 September 2012 4 | Leeds United | 3–3 | Blackburn Rovers | Leeds |
| 15:00 BST | Diouf 41'; McCormack 56'; Becchio 65' | Report | Olsson 19'; Gomes 27'; Rochina 84' | Stadium: Elland Road; Attendance: 24,411; Referee: Neil Swarbrick |

| 15 September 2012 5 | Cardiff City | 2–1 | Leeds United | Cardiff |
| 15:00 BST | Bellamy 67'; Whittingham 73' (pen.) | Report | Austin 77' | Stadium: Cardiff City Stadium; Attendance: 23,836; Referee: Paul Tierney |

| 18 September 2012 6 | Leeds United | 2–3 | Hull City | Leeds |
| 19:45 BST | Becchio 8' (pen.); Gray 90' | Report | Elmohamady 23'; Faye 29'; Koren 76' | Stadium: Elland Road; Attendance: 19,750; Referee: Roger East |

| 22 September 2012 7 | Leeds United | 2–1 | Nottingham Forest | Leeds |
| 15:00 BST | Becchio 14'; Poleon 25' | Report | Blackstock 60' | Stadium: Elland Road; Attendance: 24,292; Referee: Andy D'Urso |

| 29 September 2012 8 | Bristol City | 2–3 | Leeds United | Bristol |
| 15:00 BST | Adomah 70'; Austin 90' (o.g.) | Report | Diouf 64', 81'; Tonge 83' | Stadium: Ashton Gate; Attendance: 15,692; Referee: Stuart Attwell |

| 2 October 2012 9 | Bolton Wanderers | 2–2 | Leeds United | Bolton |
| 20:00 BST | K. Davies 14', 79' | Report | Byram 45'; Becchio 47' (pen.) | Stadium: Reebok Stadium; Attendance: 21,258; Referee: Phil Dowd |

| 6 October 2012 10 | Leeds United | 1–0 | Barnsley | Leeds |
| 15:00 BST | Becchio 42' (pen.) | Report | | Stadium: Elland Road; Attendance: 22,569; Referee: Darren Deadman |

| 19 October 2012 11 | Sheffield Wednesday | 1–1 | Leeds United | Sheffield |
| 19:45 BST | Bothroyd 43' | Report | Tonge 76' | Stadium: Hillsborough Stadium; Attendance: 28,582; Referee: Eddie Ilderton |

| 23 October 2012 12 | Leeds United | 1–1 | Charlton Athletic | Leeds |
| 19:45 BST | Norris 36' | Report | Dervite 49' | Stadium: Elland Road; Attendance: 17,384; Referee: Nigel Miller |

| 27 October 2012 13 | Leeds United | 0–1 | Birmingham City | Leeds |
| 15:00 BST | | Report | Lita 75' | Stadium: Elland Road; Attendance: 22,152; Referee: Graham Salisbury |

| 2 November 2012 14 | Brighton & Hove Albion | 2–2 | Leeds United | Brighton |
| 19:45 GMT | Mackail-Smith 15' (pen.), 47' | Report | Diouf 36' (pen.); Brown 65' | Stadium: AMEX Stadium; Attendance: 26,402; Referee: Lee Mason |

| 6 November 2012 15 | Burnley | 1–0 | Leeds United | Burnley |
| 19:45 GMT | Austin 82' | Report | | Stadium: Turf Moor; Attendance: 14,470; Referee: Geoff Eltringham |

| 10 November 2012 16 | Leeds United | 1–6 | Watford | Leeds |
| 15:00 GMT | Tonge 80' (pen.); Pearce (red card) 45' | Report | Vydra 27', 82'; Abdi 62'; Yeates 75'; Murray 90+4'; Deeney 90+8' | Stadium: Elland Road; Attendance: 19,104; Referee: Trevor Kettle |

| 18 November 2012 17 | Millwall | 1–0 | Leeds United | South Bermondsey |
| 13:15 GMT | Wood 85' | Report | Varney (red card) 47' | Stadium: The Den; Attendance: 13,117; Referee: Mark Halsey |

| 24 November 2012 18 | Leeds United | 2–1 | Crystal Palace | Leeds |
| 15:00 GMT | Becchio 51'; Green 76' | Report | Ramage 85' | Stadium: Elland Road; Attendance: 20,964; Referee: David Coote |

| 27 November 2012 19 | Leeds United | 1–0 | Leicester City | Leeds |
| 19:45 GMT | Becchio 3' (pen.) | Report | | Stadium: Elland Road; Attendance: 17,717; Referee: Mick Russell |

| 1 December 2012 20 | Huddersfield Town | 2–4 | Leeds United | Huddersfield |
| 12:30 GMT | Atkinson 12'; Clayton 43' (pen.) | Report | Tonge 35'; Becchio 37', 86'; Norris 70' | Stadium: John Smith's Stadium; Attendance: 20,372; Referee: Mike Dean |

| 8 December 2012 21 | Derby County | 3–1 | Leeds United | Derby |
| 13:00 GMT | Sammon 16'; Buxton 65'; Davies 90+4' | Report | Green 45' | Stadium: Pride Park Stadium; Attendance: 25,034 (3,453 away fans); Referee: Scott Mathieson |

| 15 December 2012 22 | Leeds United | 2–0 | Ipswich Town | Leeds |
| 15:00 GMT | Thomas 18'; Green 67' | Report | | Stadium: Elland Road; Attendance: 19,123; Referee: Oliver Langford |

| 22 December 2012 23 | Leeds United | 2–1 | Middlesbrough | Leeds |
| 15:00 GMT | Becchio 44', 72' | Report | Jutkiewicz 28' | Stadium: Elland Road; Attendance: 25,406; Referee: Paul Tierney |

| 26 December 2012 24 | Nottingham Forest | 4–2 | Leeds United | Nottingham |
| 12:15 GMT | Sharp 44' (pen.), 54'; Austin 57' (o.g.); Blackstock 61' | Report | Green 12'; Somma 90' | Stadium: The City Ground; Attendance: 26,670; Referee: Lee Probert |

| 29 December 2012 25 | Hull City | 2–0 | Leeds United | Kingston upon Hull |
| 12:30 GMT | Evans 52'; Meyler 55' | Report | | Stadium: KC Stadium; Attendance: 23,453; Referee: Geoff Eltringham |

| 1 January 2013 26 | Leeds United | 1–0 | Bolton Wanderers | Leeds |
| 15:00 GMT | Becchio 66' (pen.) | Report | | Stadium: Elland Road; Attendance: 22,386; Referee: Phil Gibbs |

| 12 January 2013 27 | Barnsley | 2–0 | Leeds United | Barnsley |
| 15:00 GMT | Dagnall 63' (pen.), 66' | Report | | Stadium: Oakwell; Attendance: 13,999; Referee: Craig Dawson |

| 19 January 2013 28 | Leeds United | 1–0 | Bristol City | Leeds |
| 15:00 GMT | McCormack 67' | Report | | Stadium: Elland Road; Attendance: 18,156; Referee: Darren Sheldrake |

| 2 February 2013 29 | Leeds United | 0–1 | Cardiff City | Leeds |
| 12:30 GMT | | Report | Campbell 64' | Stadium: Elland Road; Attendance: 19,236; Referee: Mike Dean |

| 9 February 2013 30 | Wolverhampton Wanderers | 2–2 | Leeds United | Wolverhampton |
| 15:00 GMT | Peltier 54' (o.g.); Batth 90' | Report | Varney 65'; McCormack 78' (pen.) | Stadium: Molineux Stadium; Attendance: 23,463 (2,570 away fans); Referee: Roger East |

| 12 February 2013 31 | Middlesbrough | 1–0 | Leeds United | Middlesbrough |
| 19:45 GMT | Main 82' | Report | | Stadium: Riverside Stadium; Attendance: 18,388; Referee: Keith Stroud |

| 20 February 2013 32 | Leeds United | 2–0 | Blackpool | Leeds |
| 19:45 GMT | Norris 57'; Morison 61' | Report | | Stadium: Elland Road; Attendance: 25,532; Referee: Carl Boyeson |

| 23 February 2013 33 | Blackburn Rovers | 0–0 | Leeds United | Blackburn |
| 15:00 GMT | | Report | | Stadium: Ewood Park; Attendance: 18,467; Referee: Iain Williamson |

| 2 March 2013 34 | Leeds United | 1–0 | Millwall | Leeds |
| 12:30 GMT | McCormack (penalty missed) 28'; Warnock 72' (pen.) | Report | | Stadium: Elland Road; Attendance: 19,002; Referee: Mike Jones |

| 5 March 2013 35 | Leicester City | 1–1 | Leeds United | Leicester |
| 19:45 GMT | Keane 90+4' | Report | Byram 52' | Stadium: King Power Stadium; Attendance: 22,660; Referee: Paul Tierney |

| 9 March 2013 36 | Crystal Palace | 2–2 | Leeds United | Selhurst |
| 15:00 GMT | Murray 27', 84' | Report | Morison 56', 69' | Stadium: Selhurst Park; Attendance: 19,976; Referee: Dean Whitestone |

| 12 March 2013 37 | Leeds United | 1–1 | Peterborough United | Leeds |
| 15:00 GMT | Byram 56' | Report | Gayle 15' | Stadium: Elland Road; Attendance: 24,240; Referee: Simon Hooper |

| 16 March 2013 38 | Leeds United | 1–2 | Huddersfield Town | Leeds |
| 12:30 GMT | White 60' | Report | Danns 54'; Vaughan 85' | Stadium: Elland Road; Attendance: 23,814; Referee: Andre Marriner |

| 30 March 2013 39 | Ipswich Town | 3–0 | Leeds United | Ipswich |
| 15:00 GMT | McGoldrick 45', 49'; Emmanuel-Thomas 68' | Report | Lees (red card) 32' | Stadium: Portman Road; Attendance: 20,402; Referee: James Adcock |

| 1 April 2013 40 | Leeds United | 1–2 | Derby County | Leeds |
| 17:05 BST | McCormack 66' | Report | Coutts 72'; Buxton 88' | Stadium: Elland Road; Attendance: 21,384; Referee: Roger East |

| 6 April 2013 41 | Charlton Athletic | 2–1 | Leeds United | Charlton |
| 15:00 BST | Jackson 48'; Obika 90+4' | | Varney 82' | Stadium: The Valley; Attendance: 18,900; Referee: Stuart Attwell |

| 13 April 2013 42 | Leeds United | 2–1 | Sheffield Wednesday | Leeds |
| 12:30 BST | Varney 63', 69' | Report | Johnson 27' | Stadium: Elland Road; Attendance: 23,936; Referee: Neil Swarbrick |

| 16 April 2013 43 | Leeds United | 1–0 | Burnley | Leeds |
| 19:45 BST | Austin 63' | Report | | Stadium: Elland Road; Attendance: 16,788; Referee: Fred Graham |

| 20 April 2013 44 | Birmingham City | 1–0 | Leeds United | Birmingham |
| 15:00 BST | Mullins 70' | Report | | Stadium: St Andrew's; Attendance: 17,666; Referee: Simon Hooper |

| 27 April 2013 45 | Leeds United | 1–2 | Brighton & Hove Albion | Leeds |
| 15:00 BST | Diouf 74' (pen.); Austin (red card) 12'; Diouf (red card) 75' | Report | Buckley 10'; Ulloa 87'; Calderón (red card) 73' | Stadium: Elland Road; Attendance: 24,904; Referee: Graham Scott |

| 4 May 2013 46 | Watford | 1–2 | Leeds United | Watford |
| 12:45 BST | Abdi 45+6' | Report | Poleon 42'; McCormack 90' | Stadium: Vicarage Road; Attendance: 16,969; Referee: Graham Salisbury |

=== FA Cup ===
| 5 January 2013 Third round | Leeds United | 1–1 | Birmingham City | Leeds |
| 15:00 GMT | Becchio 60' | Report | Elliott 32' | Stadium: Elland Road; Attendance: 11,447; Referee: Chris Foy |

| 15 January 2013 Third round replay | Birmingham City | 1–2 | Leeds United | Birmingham |
| 19:45 GMT | Elliott 36' | Report | McCormack 70'; Diouf 75' (pen.) | Stadium: St Andrew's; Attendance: 8,926; Referee: Andy Woolmer |

| 27 January 2013 Fourth round | Leeds United | 2–1 | Tottenham Hotspur | Leeds |
| 14:00 GMT | Varney 15'; McCormack 50' | Report | Dempsey 58' | Stadium: Elland Road; Attendance: 29,943; Referee: Kevin Friend |

| 17 February 2013 Fifth Round | Manchester City | 4–0 | Leeds United | Manchester |
| 14:00 GMT | Y.Touré 5'; Agüero 15' (pen.), 74'; Tevez 52' | Report | | Stadium: Etihad Stadium; Attendance: 46,849; Referee: Mark Clattenburg |

=== League Cup ===
| 11 August 2012 First round | Leeds United | 4–0 | Shrewsbury Town | Leeds |
| 19:45 BST | Becchio 20'; Varney 26'; Norris 65'; McCormack 69' (pen.) | Report | | Stadium: Elland Road; Attendance: 18,194; Referee: Mark Heywood |

| 28 August 2012 Second round | Leeds United | 3–0 | Oxford United | Leeds |
| 19:45 BST | Austin 27'; Byram 33'; Lees 73' | Report | | Stadium: Elland Road; Attendance: 13, 798; Referee: Gary Sutton |

| 25 September 2012 Third round | Leeds United | 2–1 | Everton | Leeds |
| 19:45 BST | White 4'; Austin 70' | Report | Distin 81' | Stadium: Elland Road; Attendance: 21,164; Referee: Lee Mason |

| 30 October 2012 Fourth round | Leeds United | 3–0 | Southampton | Leeds |
| 19:45 GMT | Tonge 34'; Diouf 85'; Becchio 90+1' (pen.) | Report | | Stadium: Elland Road; Attendance: 17,002; Referee: Chris Foy |

| 19 December 2012 Quarter-finals | Leeds United | 1–5 | Chelsea | Leeds |
| 19:45 GMT | Becchio 37' | Report | Mata 47'; Ivanović 64'; Moses 66'; Hazard 81'; Torres 84' | Stadium: Elland Road; Attendance: 33,816; Referee: Andre Marriner |

== First-team squad ==
=== Squad information ===
| N | Pos. | Nat. | Name | Age | Since | App | Goals | Ends | Transfer fee | Notes |
|---|---|---|---|---|---|---|---|---|---|---|
| 1 | GK | (Republic of Ireland) | Paddy Kenny | 34 | 2012 | 47 | 0 | 2015 | £400,000 | |
| 2 | DF | (England) | Lee Peltier | 26 | 2012 | 48 | 0 | 2015 | £800,000 | |
| 3 | DF | (England) | Adam Drury | 34 | 2012 | 15 | 0 | 2014 | Free | |
| 4 | DF | (England) | Tom Lees | 22 | 2008 | 93 | 4 | 2016 | Youth system | |
| 5 | DF | (England) | Jason Pearce | 25 | 2012 | 41 | 0 | 2016 | £500,000 | |
| 6 | DF | (Australia) | Patrick Kisnorbo ^{1} | 32 | 2009 | 58 | 1 | 2013 | Free | |
| 7 | MF | (Republic of Ireland) | Paul Green | 30 | 2012 | 36 | 4 | 2014 | Free | |
| 8 | MF | (Jamaica) | Rodolph Austin | 27 | 2012 | 38 | 4 | 2015 | £300,000 | |
| 9 | FW | (Wales) (England) | Steve Morison | 29 | 2013 | 16 | 3 | 2016 | PX | |
| 11 | MF | (England) | Luke Varney | 30 | 2012 | 39 | 6 | 2014 | £300,000 | |
| 12 | GK | (England) | Jamie Ashdown | 30 | 2012 | 8 | 0 | 2014 | Free | |
| 14 | DF | (Republic of Ireland) (England) | Aidan White | 21 | 2008 | 98 | 2 | 2015 | Youth system | |
| 15 | DF | (England) | Stephen Warnock | 31 | 2013 | 17 | 1 | 2015 | Free | |
| 17 | MF | (England) | Michael Brown | 36 | 2011 | 60 | 2 | 2014 | Free | |
| 18 | MF | (England) | Michael Tonge | 30 | 2012 | 39 | 5 | 2015 | £200,000 | |
| 19 | MF | (England) | David Norris | 32 | 2012 | 34 | 4 | 2015 | Free | |
| 21 | FW | (Senegal) | El-Hadji Diouf | 32 | 2012 | 45 | 7 | 2014 | Free | |
| 22 | FW | (France) (Central African Republic) | Habib Habibou ^{2} | 26 | 2013 | 4 | 0 | 2013 | N/A | |
| 23 | DF | (England) | Zac Thompson | 20 | 2011 | 11 | 0 | 2015 | Free | |
| 25 | DF | (England) | Sam Byram | 19 | 2012 | 53 | 4 | 2016 | Youth system | |
| 26 | FW | (England) | Dominic Poleon | 19 | 2010 | 8 | 2 | 2015 | Youth system | |
| 27 | MF | (England) | Sanchez Payne | 20 | 2010 | 0 | 0 | 2013 | Youth system | |
| 28 | FW | (South Africa) | Davide Somma | 28 | 2009 | 40 | 13 | 2013 | Free | |
| 30 | MF | (England) | Ryan Hall | 25 | 2012 | 8 | 0 | 2015 | £150,000 | |
| 32 | MF | (England) | Chris Dawson | 18 | 2012 | 1 | 0 | 2016 | Youth system | |
| 33 | GK | (England) | Alex Cairns | 20 | 2011 | 1 | 0 | 2014 | Youth system | |
| 34 | DF | (England) | Ross Killock | 18 | 2012 | 0 | 0 | 2014 | Youth system | |
| 44 | FW | (Scotland) | Ross McCormack | 26 | 2010 | 108 | 29 | 2015 | £350,000 | |
| 55 | MF | (England) | Simon Lenighan | 18 | 2012 | 0 | 0 | 2014 | Youth system | |
| — | DF | (England) | Leigh Bromby | 32 | 2009 | 62 | 1 | 2013 | £250,000 | |
| — | DF | (England) | Charlie Taylor ^{3} | 19 | 2011 | 4 | 0 | 2014 | Youth system | |
Players who have been available for selection this season, but have now permanently left the club:
| 9 | MF | (England) | Jerome Thomas | 30 | 2012 | 7 | 1 | Jan 2013 | N/A | |
| 10 | FW | (Argentina) | Luciano Becchio | 29 | 2008 | 221 | 86 | 2014 | £300,000 | |
| 15 | DF | (England) | Alan Tate | 30 | 2012 | 11 | 0 | Jan 2013 | N/A | |
| 20 | FW | (Scotland) (England) | Andy Gray | 35 | 2012; 1995 | 38 | 1 | 2013; 1998 | Free; YS | |
| 20 | MF | (England) | Ross Barkley | 19 | 2013 | 4 | 0 | Feb 2013 | N/A | |
| 22 | MF | (United States) | Robbie Rogers | 25 | 2012 | 4 | 0 | 2013 | Free | |
| — | MF | (Honduras) | Ramón Núñez | 27 | 2010 | 25 | 5 | 2015 | Free | |

- Last updated: 8 April 2014
- Source: Wikipedia players' articles,
- Ordered by Squad Number.

Appearances (starts and substitute appearances) and goals include those in the Championship (and playoffs), League One (and playoffs), FA Cup, League Cup and Football League Trophy.

^{1}On loan at Ipswich Town
^{2}On loan from SV Zulte Waregem
^{3}Currently on loan at Inverness CT

=== Transfer-listed players ===
| N | Pos. | Nat. | Name | Age | Since | App | Goals | Ends | Transfer fee | Notes |
|---|---|---|---|---|---|---|---|---|---|---|
| 16 | MF | (England) | Danny Pugh^{1} ^{2} | 30 | 2011; 2004 | 98 | 8 | 2014; 2006 | £500,000; PX | |
| 24 | DF | (England) | Paul Connolly^{3} | 29 | 2010 | 63 | 0 | 2013 | Free | |
| 31 | GK | (England) (United States) | Paul Rachubka ^{4} | 31 | 2011 | 7 | 0 | 2013 | Free | |

- Last updated: 2 May 2012
- Source: Wikipedia players' articles,
- Ordered by Squad number.

Appearances (starts and substitute appearances) and goals include those in the Championship (and playoffs), League One (and playoffs), FA Cup, League Cup and Football League Trophy.

^{1}Player made fifty eight appearances (scoring six goals) for the club during his first spell at the club
^{2}Player is currently on loan at Sheffield Wednesday
^{3}Player is currently on loan at Preston North End
^{4}Player is currently on loan at Accrington Stanley

== Transfers ==
=== In ===
| No. | Pos. | Nat. | Name | Age | EU | Moving from | Type | Transfer window | Ends | Transfer fee | Source |
|---|---|---|---|---|---|---|---|---|---|---|---|
| 5 | DF | (England) | Jason Pearce | 24 | EU | Portsmouth | Transfer | Summer | 2016 | £500,000 | |
| 3 | DF | (England) | Adam Drury | 33 | EU | Norwich City | Transfer | Summer | 2014 | Free | |
| 7 | MF | (Republic of Ireland) | Paul Green | 29 | EU | Derby County | Transfer | Summer | 2014 | Free | |
| 1 | GK | (Republic of Ireland) (England) | Paddy Kenny | 34 | EU | Queens Park Rangers | Transfer | Summer | 2015 | £400,000 | |
| 20 | FW | (Scotland) (England) | Andy Gray | 34 | EU | Barnsley | Transfer | Summer | 2013 | Free | |
| 12 | GK | (England) | Jamie Ashdown | 31 | EU | Portsmouth | Transfer | Summer | 2014 | Free | |
| 11 | MF | (England) | Luke Varney | 29 | EU | Portsmouth | Transfer | Summer | 2014 | £300,000 | |
| 19 | MF | (England) | David Norris | 31 | EU | Portsmouth | Transfer | Summer | 2015 | Free | |
| 8 | MF | (Jamaica) | Rodolph Austin | 27 | Non-EU | Brann (Norway) | Transfer | Summer | 2015 | £300,000 | |
| 2 | DF | (England) | Lee Peltier | 25 | EU | Leicester City | Transfer | Summer | 2015 | £800,000 | |
| 21 | FW | (Senegal) | El-Hadji Diouf | 31 | Non-EU | Doncaster Rovers | Transfer | Summer | Jan 2013 | Free | |
| 18 | MF | (England) | Michael Tonge | 29 | EU | Stoke City | Loan | Summer | 23 December 2012 | —N/a | |
| 30 | MF | (England) | Ryan Hall | 24 | EU | Southend United | Loan | Summer | Jan 2013 | —N/a | |
| 15 | DF | (England) | Alan Tate | 30 | EU | Swansea City (Wales) | Loan | Summer | 26 January 2013 | —N/a | |
| 9 | MF | (England) | Jerome Thomas | 29 | EU | West Bromwich Albion | Loan | Summer | 2 January 2013 | —N/a | |
| 30 | MF | (England) | Ryan Hall | 24 | EU | Southend United | Transfer | Winter | 2015 | £150,000 | |
| 18 | MF | (England) | Michael Tonge | 29 | EU | Stoke City | Transfer | Winter | 2015 | £200,000 | |
| 20 | MF | (England) | Ross Barkley | 19 | EU | Everton | Loan | Winter | 12 February 2013 | —N/a | |
| 9 | FW | (Wales) (England) | Steve Morison | 29 | EU | Norwich City | Transfer | Winter | 2016 | Player Exchange | |
| 15 | DF | (England) | Stephen Warnock | 31 | EU | Aston Villa | Transfer | Winter | 2015 | Free | |
| 22 | FW | (France) (Central African Republic) | Habib Habibou | 25 | Non-EU | Zulte Waregem (Belgium) | Loan | Winter | May 2013 | —N/a | |

=== Out ===
| No. | Pos. | Name | Country | Age | Type | Moving to | Transfer window | Transfer fee | Apps | Goals | Source |
|---|---|---|---|---|---|---|---|---|---|---|---|
| 4 | DF | Alex Bruce | (Republic of Ireland) (England) | 27 | Out of contract | Hull City | Summer | n/a | 31 | 4 | |
| 11 | MF | Lloyd Sam | (Ghana) (England) | 27 | Out of contract | New York Red Bulls (United States) | Summer | n/a | 39 | 3 | |
| 18 | FW | Mikael Forssell | (Finland) | 31 | Out of contract | HJK (Finland) | Summer | n/a | 17 | 0 | |
| 25 | MF | Danny Webber | (England) | 30 | Out of contract | Doncaster Rovers | Summer | n/a | 13 | 1 | |
| 24 | GK | Maik Taylor | (Northern Ireland) (Germany) | 40 | Out of contract | Millwall | Summer | n/a | 0 | 0 | |
| 15 | MF | Adam Clayton | (England) | 23 | Transfer | Huddersfield Town | Summer | £500,000 | 49 | 6 | |
| 1 | GK | Andy Lonergan | (England) | 28 | Transfer | Bolton Wanderers | Summer | £300,000 | 38 | 0 | |
| 23 | MF | Robert Snodgrass | (Scotland) (England) | 24 | Transfer | Norwich City | Summer | £3,000,000 | 190 | 41 | |
| 5 | DF | Andy O'Brien | (Republic of Ireland) | 33 | Transfer | Vancouver Whitecaps FC (Canada) | Summer | Free | 38 | 2 | |
| 9 | FW | Billy Paynter | (England) | 28 | Transfer | Doncaster Rovers | Summer | Free | 28 | 3 | |
| 24 | DF | Paul Connolly | (England) | 28 | One month Loan | Portsmouth | Summer | n/a | 63 | 0 | |
| — | GK | Alex Cairns | (England) | 19 | Two month loan | Stalybridge Celtic | Summer | n/a | 1 | 0 | |
| 22 | FW | Robbie Rogers | (United States) | 25 | Loan till January | Stevenage | Summer | n/a | 4 | 0 | |
| — | DF | Charlie Taylor | (England) | 18 | Two month loan | York City | Summer | n/a | 4 | 0 | |
| — | DF | Ross Killock | (England) | 18 | One month loan | Alfreton Town | Summer | n/a | 0 | 0 | |
| 23 | MF | Zac Thompson | (England) | 19 | Loan until end of season | Bury | Summer | n/a | 11 | 0 | |
| 26 | FW | Dominic Poleon | (England) | 19 | One month loan | Bury | Summer | n/a | 6 | 1 | |
| 28 | MF | Nathan Turner | (England) | 20 | Loan till End of Season | Chester | Summer | n/a | 0 | 0 | |
| 33 | DF | Lewis Turner | (England) | 20 | One month loan | Harrogate Town | Summer | n/a | 0 | 0 | |
| 31 | GK | Paul Rachubka | (England) | 31 | Loan until end of season | Accrington Stanley | Summer | n/a | 7 | 0 | |
| 6 | DF | Patrick Kisnorbo | (Australia) | 31 | Loan until end of season | Ipswich Town | Winter | n/a | 57 | 1 | |
| 20 | FW | Andy Gray | (Scotland) (England) | 35 | Released | Bradford City | Winter | n/a | 38 | 1 | |
| 22 | FW | Robbie Rogers | (United States) | 25 | Released | LA Galaxy (United States) | Winter | n/a | 4 | 0 | |
| 24 | DF | Paul Connolly | (England) | 29 | Loan till End of April | Preston North End | Winter | n/a | 63 | 0 | |
| 33 | DF | Lewis Turner | (England) | 20 | Loan till End of Season | Chester | Summer | n/a | 0 | 0 | |
| — | DF | Charlie Taylor | (England) | 19 | Loan till End of Season | Inverness Caledonian Thistle (Scotland) | Winter | n/a | 4 | 0 | |
| 16 | MF | Danny Pugh | (England) | 30 | Loan till End of Season | Sheffield Wednesday | Winter | n/a | 98 | 8 | |
| — | MF | Ramón Núñez | (Honduras) | 27 | Released | FC Dallas (United States) | Winter | n/a | 25 | 5 | |
| 10 | FW | Luciano Becchio | (Argentina) | 29 | Transfer | Norwich City | Winter | £200,000 + Player | 221 | 86 | |
| 26 | FW | Dominic Poleon | (England) | 19 | Loan until end of season | Sheffield United | Winter | n/a | 7 | 1 | |

EU = if holds or not a European Union passport; Country: when 2 flags, 1st flag = country that plays for internationally, 2nd flag = country of birth; N = number on jersey; P = Position (for position name, pause mouse pointer on abbreviation); Name = Name on jersey (for more extensive name, pause mouse pointer on name); Age = age on the day of the signing; Moving from = only indicate the club the player was playing before start playing for this club in this season, for the type of the moving see Status column; Moving to = only indicates the club the player is going to play next, for the type of the moving see Status column; Ends = when the player's current contract ends; n/a = Not applicable.

=== New contracts ===
| No. | Pos. | Nat. | Name | Age | Status | Contract length | Expiry date | Source |
|---|---|---|---|---|---|---|---|---|
| — | MF | (England) | Nathan Turner | 34 | Signed | 1 year^{1} | June 2013 | |
| — | DF | (England) | Lewis Turner | 34 | Signed | 1 year^{1} | June 2013 | |
| 25 | DF | (England) | Sam Byram | 33 | Signed | 3½ years | June 2016 | |
| 55 | MF | (England) | Simon Lenighan | 18 | Signed | 1 year^{2} | June 2014 | |
| 34 | DF | (England) | Ross Killock | 32 | Signed | 1 year^{2} | June 2014 | |
| — | MF | (England) | Charlie Clamp | 32 | Signed | 1 year^{1} | June 2013 | |
| 26 | FW | (England) | Dominic Poleon | 33 | Signed | 2½ years | June 2015 | |
| — | DF | (Germany) | Monty Gimpel | 33 | Signed | 1 year^{1} | June 2013 | |
| — | MF | (Scotland) | Robert Snodgrass | 39 | Rejected | 1 year | June 2014 | |
| 44 | FW | (Scotland) | Ross McCormack | 40 | Signed | 3 years | June 2015 | |
| 14 | MF | (Republic of Ireland) (England) | Aidan White | 34 | Signed | 3 years | June 2015 | |
| 4 | DF | (England) | Tom Lees | 35 | Signed | 4 Years | June 2016 | |
| 23 | MF | (England) | Zac Thompson | 33 | Signed | 3 years | June 2015 | |
| 17 | MF | (England) | Michael Brown | 49 | Signed | 1 year^{3} | June 2014 | |
| 32 | MF | (Wales) (England) | Chris Dawson | 32 | Signed | 3 years | June 2016 | |
| 21 | FW | (Senegal) | El-Hadji Diouf | 45 | Signed | 1½ years | June 2014 | |
| 10 | FW | (Argentina) | Luciano Becchio | 42 | Rejected | 3½ years | June 2016 | |
| — | FW | (England) | Lewis Walters | 31 | Signed | 2 years | June 2015 | |
| — | GK | (Republic of Ireland) | Eric Grimes | 31 | Signed | 2 years | June 2015 | |
| — | FW | (England) | Luke Parkin | 31 | Signed | 2 years | June 2015 | |
| — | MF | (England) | Alex Mowatt | 31 | Signed | 2 years | June 2015 | |

^{1}The contract includes the option to extend the contract by a further year.
^{2}Option to extend by further year taken up later in season.
^{3}Contract extended by further year after making 30 appearances.

== Awards ==
=== Internal Awards ===
==== Official Player of the Year Awards ====
The results of the 2012–13 Leeds United A.F.C. Player of the Year Awards were announced at a dinner on 27 April 2013 at Elland Road.

- Player of the Year: Sam Byram
- Young Player of the Year: Sam Byram
- Players' Player of the Year: Sam Byram
- Goal of the Season: Ross McCormack (vs Tottenham, 27 January)
- Fastest Goal of the Season: Aidan White (vs Everton, 25 September)
- Best Contribution to Community: Leigh Bromby
- Chairman's Special Award: Tom Lees
