= Aidy White =

Irish footballer

Personal information
- Full name: Aidan Peter White
- Date of birth: 10 October 1991 (age 35)
- Place of birth: Otley, West Yorkshire, England
- Height: 5 ft 9 in (1.75 m)
- Positions: Left-back; left winger

Youth career
- 2002–2008: Leeds United

Senior career*
Years	Team	Apps	(Gls)
2008–2015	Leeds United	85	(1)
2010–2011	→ Oldham Athletic (loan)	5	(2)
2011	→ Oldham Athletic (loan)	19	(2)
2013	→ Sheffield United (loan)	8	(0)
2015–2016	Rotherham United	8	(0)
2015–2016	→ Barnsley (loan)	6	(0)
2016–2017	Barnsley	18	(0)
2019–2021	Heart of Midlothian	24	(0)
2021–2023	Rochdale	24	(0)
Total		197	(5)

International career
2009	England U19	1	(0)
2011–2013	Republic of Ireland U21	10	(1)
- * Club domestic league appearances and goals

Aidan Peter White (born 10 October 1991) is a former professional footballer who played as a left-back and left winger. Born in England, he represented both England U19s and Republic of Ireland U21s at international level.

Despite an injury-laden career, he achieved considerable success - winning three promotions and the EFL Trophy.

== Club career ==
=== Leeds United ===
==== 2008–09 season ====
Born in Otley, West Yorkshire, White started his career at Leeds United in The Championship of the English Football League, joining their youth system in 2002, having attended the Brazilian Soccer Schools scheme for a number of years. He made his debut for the Leeds first team at the age of 16 in a League Cup game against Crystal Palace on 26 August 2008, being given a standing ovation from Leeds fans when he was replaced by substitute Bradley Johnson. White made his league debut in the 2–0 win over Carlisle United on 20 September 2008 and signed a professional contract with Leeds in December, contracting him to the club until June 2012. Having been highlighted as one of 20 future England stars, along with fellow Leeds teammate Fabian Delph in an article in The Guardian in November, injury problems led to White missing much of the later part of the season as Leeds reached the playoffs.

==== 2009–10 season ====
White returned to training after his injury problems for the start of the 2009–10 season. His injury problems resurfaced after suffering a knee injury during pre-season however, and he eventually made his first start and appearance of the season in a Football League Trophy game against Darlington. White started for Leeds in the FA Cup replay against Kettering Town but had to be replaced in the second half through injury. White did not make his first league start of the season until the fixture at Elland Road against Oldham Athletic. White was played regularly for the remainder of the season, in which Leeds gained promotion to the Championship, after finishing runner-up in League One. White's form prompted him to be voted Leeds United's Young Player of the Year in the fans' End of Season Awards.

==== 2010–11 season ====
He made his first appearance in the Championship when he came on in the opening fixture as a second-half substitute in the loss to Derby County. White made his first start of the season in the match against Doncaster Rovers coming into the side for Fede Bessone.

After starting Leeds' first season back in the Championship as a first team regular, White picked up a back injury soon after which ruled him out for a month. Manager Simon Grayson subsequently revealed that he was looking to send White out on loan, so that he could get some more first team experience and also help improve his match fitness. He also stated that long-term he saw White as a left winger rather than a left back.

==== Oldham Athletic loan ====
On 18 November 2010, White joined Oldham Athletic on loan until the following January, a club managed by his former Leeds teammate Paul Dickov. White scored his first goal in senior football on his debut for Oldham against Dagenham & Redbridge. White's loan spell was disrupted by five fixture postponements due to adverse weather conditions. He rejoined Oldham on loan on 27 January 2011 until the end of the season. White finished his loan spell having played 24 matches and scoring four goals.

==== 2011–12 season ====
===== Return to Leeds =====
White wanted to use the experience during his loan spell the previous season to help revitalise his Leeds United career and to help earn him a regular starting spot. White also claimed that his time on loan had helped stop him get the bouts of cramp he used to suffer when playing for Leeds. After playing a part in most of Leeds' pre-season fixtures, White received a new squad number of 28 for the forthcoming season. After regaining a place in the starting eleven, White was suspended after being sent off against Ipswich Town. Leeds appealed against the red card decision but were rejected, meaning White was forced to serve out his suspension. In September 2011, White revealed he was now over the persistent cramp he used to suffer in games due to 'nervous anxiety' prior to his spell at Oldham. White was linked with a move to Derby County in October; however, he revealed he wanted to stay at Leeds long-term after cementing his place in the Leeds side. Having been Leeds' first choice left back, after a change in formation White found himself playing out on the left wing as the season progressed. White turned down the offer of a new four-year contract with the club in December, amidst rumoured Premier League interest, but remained in negotiations with the club, with manager Simon Grayson confident White would commit his long-term future to Leeds. After being deployed mainly as a left back under Simon Grayson, new manager Neil Warnock played White in an attacking right wing position. However, during March, White was ruled out for the rest of the season after picking up an injury whilst playing against Watford. With Norwich City showing an interest in signing White at the end of his contract, Leeds stated that they were finalising an improved offer to extend White's contract. After further reported transfer interest in White, this time from Newcastle United, Leeds manager Neil Warnock confirmed that White had been offered a further new contract to keep him at the club. White was again linked with moves to Celtic and Newcastle United. By the end of May, Warnock said he expected White to leave the club. French club Lille OSC were then publicly linked with signing White, as were Bundesliga club Werder Bremen.

Contrary to this speculation, in July 2012 White went on to sign a new deal with Leeds United, designed to keep him at the club for a further three years.

==== 2012–13 season ====
White was allocated the number 14 shirt for the 2012–13 season. White finally scored his first goal for Leeds United in their 2–1 League Cup victory against Premier League side Everton in September 2012. White lost his place in the side during the January transfer window as Leeds signed left-back Stephen Warnock, with White subsequently being played in an unfamiliar role on the right-wing. At the club's End of Season Awards, White's goal against Everton won the award for the fastest goal from open play.

==== 2013–14 season ====
In August 2013, Leeds United confirmed that they had rejected a joint bid from Blackpool for White and teammate Ross McCormack. However, having spent most of the season in the reserves, in October White joined Sheffield United on loan until the start of January 2014. After making eight appearances for the Blades, White picked up an ankle injury during their Boxing Day fixture with Oldham Athletic which ruled him out for a month. With his loan deal due to expire during that period, White returned early to his parent club to receive treatment.

==== 2014–15 season ====
In July 2014, after playing regularly for Leeds in pre-season, White fractured his foot in a friendly against Chesterfield, which required surgery. The injury was set to keep White out for a period of two months, but after complications it was revealed White could miss the remainder of the 2014–15 season. He did manage to return to the squad for the penultimate game of the season on 25 April 2015 when he was named as an unused substitute in a 2–1 win against Yorkshire rivals Sheffield Wednesday. On 2 May 2015, White made his first appearance of the season when he came on as a substitute in the final game of the 2014–15 season against Rotherham United.

On 13 May 2015, upon the expiry of his contract, Leeds announced that they would not be renewing White's contract at the club.

=== Rotherham United ===
==== 2015–16 season ====
On 10 June 2015, White signed a one-year contract with Rotherham United. He made ten first-team appearances for Rotherham between August and October before being sent out on loan. Upon his return from the loan spell, Rotherham United terminated his contract by mutual consent on 8 January 2016.

==== Barnsley loan ====
On 17 November, White was loaned out to League One club Barnsley until 3 January 2016.

=== Barnsley ===
On 8 January 2016, following his contract termination from Rotherham United, White signed a permanent deal with League One club Barnsley. In his first 6 months White won 2015–16 Johnstone's Paint Trophy and the 2015–16 League One Playoff Final.

On 20 June 2016, White signed a new contract with Barnsley, keeping him with the Championship club until 30 June 2017. On 10 May 2017, the club announced that White would not be offered a contract extension.

=== Heart of Midlothian ===
After two years out of football due to injury, White signed a two-year contract with Scottish Premiership club Heart of Midlothian in March 2019. On 31 May 2021, White's contract with Hearts ended and was released from the club.

=== Rochdale ===
On 5 August 2021, White signed a two-year contract with Rochdale.

White retired from football on 13 November 2023.

== International career ==
White made his England under-19 debut in March 2009, when he came on as a 73rd-minute substitute against the Czech Republic at Walsall's Bescot Stadium in a 0–0 draw. White decided to change his International allegiance, and declared himself for the Republic of Ireland U21s. He was called up to the U21 squad to play Austria on 10 August 2011. White made his debut for Republic of Ireland U21s starting the match against Austria. Ireland won the game 2–1 with White providing an assist for Robbie Brady. White was again called up to the Ireland U21 squad for friendlies against Hungary and Turkey. He kept his place in the squad for the U21 game against Liechtenstein and managed to score his first goal for Ireland in a 2–0 victory.

Ireland under-21 manager Noel King said that White had been a revelation and that he expected White to break into the full senior squad. After his form for both club and country, White was nominated for under-21 International player of the year at the FAI International Football Awards, with former Leeds teammate Darren O'Dea also nominated for an award. White captained Republic of Ireland U21s to a 4–2 victory against Italy U21s on 10 September 2012.

== Personal life ==
White was educated at St Mary's Menston Catholic Voluntary Academy and Boston Spa Academy.

== Career statistics ==
As of match played 14 January 2023

Appearances and goals by club, season and competition
Club	Season	League			National cup		League cup		Other		Total	
Club	Season	Division	Apps	Goals	Apps	Goals	Apps	Goals	Apps	Goals	Apps	Goals
Leeds United	2008–09	League One	5	0	1	0	2	0	1 (Note: Appearance(s) in Football League Trophy)	0	9	0
Leeds United	2009–10	League One	8	0	5	0	0	0	2	0	15	0
Leeds United	2010–11	Championship	2	0	0	0	1	0	—		3	0
Leeds United	2011–12	Championship	36	0	1	0	2	0	—		39	0
Leeds United	2012–13	Championship	24	1	4	0	5	1	—		33	2
Leeds United	2013–14	Championship	9	0	0	0	2	0	—		11	0
Leeds United	2014–15	Championship	1	0	0	0	0	0	—		1	0
Leeds United	Total		85	1	11	0	12	1	3	0	111	2
Oldham Athletic (loan)	2010–11	League One	24	4	0	0	0	0	0	0	24	4
Sheffield United (loan)	2013–14	League One	8	0	0	0	0	0	0	0	8	0
Rotherham United	2015–16	Championship	8	0	0	0	2	0	—		10	0
Barnsley (loan)	2015–16	League One	6	0	0	0	0	0	1	0	7	0
Barnsley	2015–16	League One	8	0	0	0	0	0	4 (Note: Three appearances in Football League Trophy, one appearance in League One playoffs)	0	12	0
Barnsley	2016–17	Championship	10	0	2	0	1	0	—		13	0
Barnsley	Total		24	0	2	0	1	0	5	0	32	0
Heart of Midlothian	2019–20	Scottish Premiership	14	0	2	0	2	0	—		18	0
Heart of Midlothian	2020–21	Scottish Championship	10	0	1	0	5	0	—		16	0
Heart of Midlothian	Total		24	0	3	0	7	0	0	0	34	0
Rochdale	2021–22	League Two	12	0	2	0	0	0	3 (Note: Appearances in EFL Trophy)	0	17	0
Rochdale	2022–23	League Two	12	0	0	0	1	0	2	0	15	0
Rochdale	Total		24	0	2	0	1	0	5	0	32	0
Career total			197	5	18	0	23	1	13	0	251	6

== Honours ==
Leeds United

- Football League One runner-up: 2009–10

Barnsley

- Football League One play-offs: 2016
- Football League Trophy: 2015–16

Hearts

- Scottish Championship: 2020–21

Individual

- Leeds United Young Player of the Year: 2009–10
