= Dominic Poleon =

Saint Lucian footballer

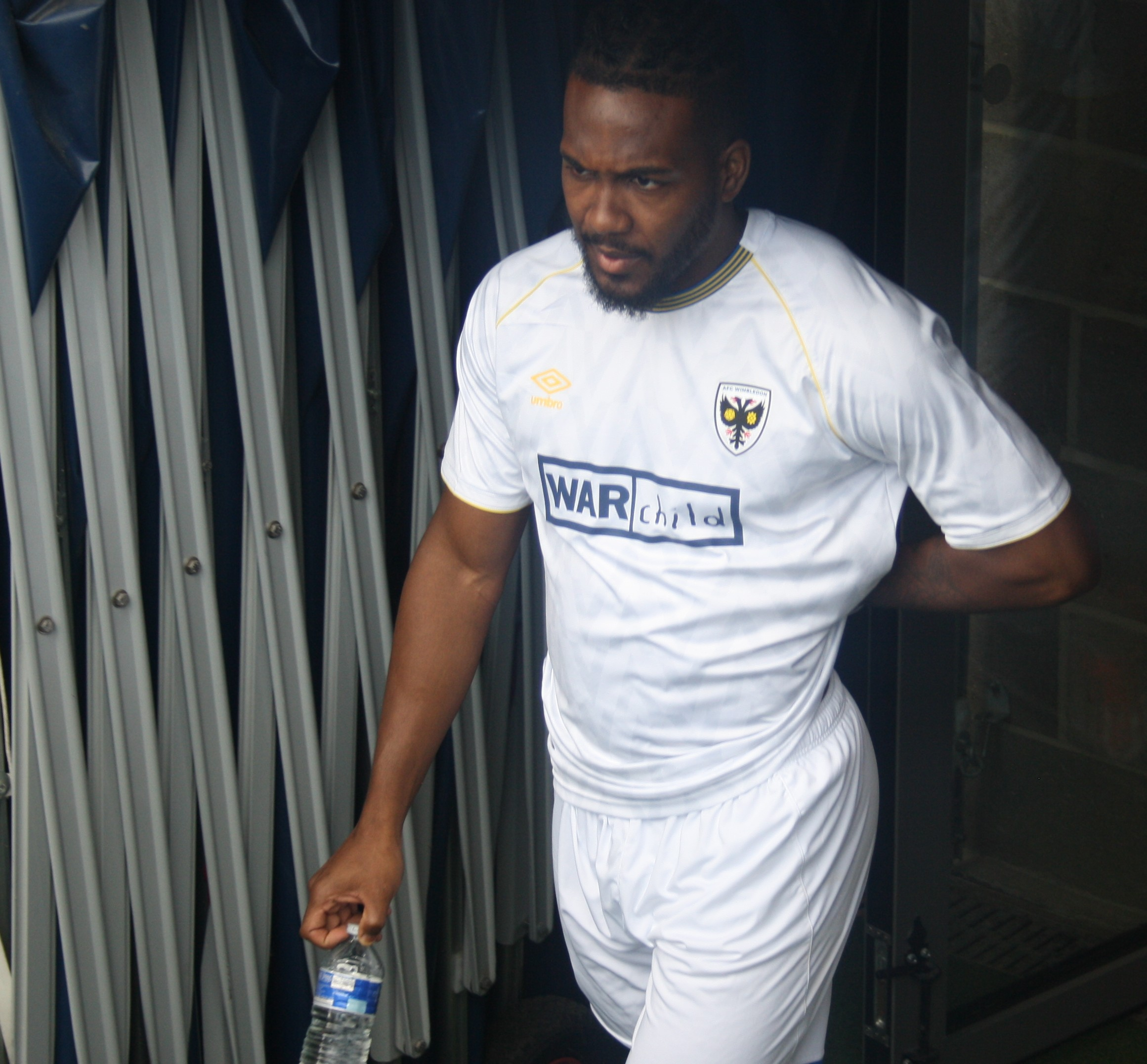
- Poleon in 2025

Personal information
- Full name: Dominic Alfred Poleon
- Date of birth: 7 September 1993 (age 33)
- Place of birth: Newham, London, England
- Height: 5 ft 8 in (1.73 m)
- Positions: Striker; winger

Team information
- Current team: Hornchurch
- Number: 21

Youth career
- 2004–2008: Chelsea
- 2008–2010: Southend United
- 2010–2012: Leeds United

Senior career*
Years	Team	Apps	(Gls)
2012–2014	Leeds United	29	(3)
2012	→ Bury (loan)	7	(2)
2013	→ Sheffield United (loan)	7	(0)
2014–2016	Oldham Athletic	60	(8)
2016–2017	AFC Wimbledon	41	(8)
2017–2018	Bradford City	32	(6)
2018–2019	Crawley Town	30	(5)
2019–2020	Newport County	5	(0)
2020	→ Dover Athletic (loan)	6	(1)
2021–2025	Ebbsfleet United	152	(76)
2025–2026	Farnborough	28	(9)
2026–	Hornchurch	23	(7)

International career
2023–	Saint Lucia	7	(3)
- * Club domestic league appearances and goals

Dominic Alfred Poleon (born 7 September 1993) is a professional footballer who plays as a forward for National League club Hornchurch. Born in England, he plays for the Saint Lucia national team.

A product of multiple academies including that of Chelsea, Poleon began his professional career with Leeds United in 2012 and would have loan spells with Bury and Sheffield United while at the club. Over the next years, following his departure from Leeds, he had short stints with other clubs throughout different levels of English football, including Oldham Athletic, AFC Wimbledon, Bradford City and Crawley Town. He signed for Ebbsfleet United in 2021, being named the National League South Player of the Season in 2024–25.

Poleon made his international debut for Saint Lucia in 2023.

== Career ==
=== Chelsea and Southend United ===
Poleon attended Brampton Manor Academy in East Ham. He began his career in football across the city in the junior teams at Chelsea but failed to progress at the Premier League club. He would join Southend United for the later years of his school life and travelled with them on a tour of France in 2009 aged 15 before being signed by Leeds a year later after being identified by Head of Recruitment Steve Holmes.

=== Leeds United ===
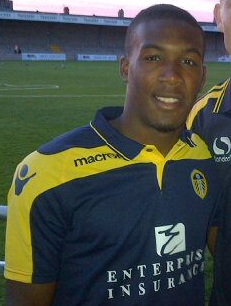
Poleon after a pre-season friendly match at Torquay United in July 2012

Poleon joined Leeds in the summer of 2010. He gained good reviews in the youth and reserve teams in his first year at the club. In the following 2011–12 season, Poleon was the leading scorer for the United youth team with 12 goals. He capped his second season at the club by signing a one-year professional contract along with fellow youth prospects Ross Killock and Monty Gimpel.

After scoring for the club's Development Team in a 2–0 friendly match victory over Alfreton Town at North Street on 21 July 2012, Poleon and several other youngsters including Sam Byram, Nathan Turner, Lewis Turner and Monty Gimpel, travelled with the senior team the following week on a pre-season tour of Cornwall and Devon. He scored again against Tavistock in a 6–0 victory and featuring as a substitute in subsequent games versus Bodmin Town and Torquay United as Leeds recorded three wins from three on their summer tour. The tour provided Poleon with the perfect opportunity to demonstrate his competency at a senior level ahead of a make-or-break year.

His performances in further pre-season games would lead to the young striker joining fellow prospect Sam Byram on the fringes of the first team for the start of manager Neil Warnock's first full season in charge as he was assigned the number 26 shirt for the campaign. He made his first team début for Leeds in the first game of the season coming on as a 76th-minute substitute against Shrewsbury Town at Elland Road in the League Cup fixture on 11 August 2012. He would make his league début two weeks later when he replaced Ross McCormack in Leeds' 2–1 win over Peterborough United.

Poleon made his first start for Leeds United in a league game against Nottingham Forest on 22 September after impressing as a substitute in a 2–3 league defeat against Hull City earlier in the week. He marked the occasion with his first professional goal in the 25th minute. Prior to the game against Forest, Neil Warnock had questioned Poleon's work ethic and approach to the game, saying that he risked his career 'fizzling out' if he didn't change his attitude. He likened Poleon's attitude to his former protégé at Crystal Palace, Victor Moses, who would prove to increase his application before joining Premier League side Wigan Athletic in £2.5m deal in 2010 and reigning UEFA Champions League winners Chelsea for a fee of around £9m two years later. The imminent loan signing of another of Warnock's former protégés and Moses' former teammate at Palace, Ryan Hall, would further limit Poleon's first-team opportunities at United as he would look to gain valuable playing experience from a loan spell in the lower leagues.

On 15 October 2012, Poleon and teammate Zac Thompson joined League One strugglers Bury on month-long loan deals. Both youngsters would be working under the newly appointed Bury manager Kevin Blackwell, who had a seventeen-year association with Warnock as player and coach between 1986 and 2003 and had managed Poleon's parent club between 2004 and 2006. He was assigned the number 33 shirt and made his debut for the Shakers in the 1–1 home draw versus Carlisle United. Poleon had hit the post in the game and provided the assist for goalscorer Thompson in the first-half. The energy and commitment of the youngsters lead to instant praise from Blackwell after the game; observing that "the two young lads from Leeds were absolutely out on their feet after that. For them, the warm up matters, every time they train matters, when they travel in – it matters and I'm really pleased with both of them, the whole team."

Poleon scored his first goal for the club in his second game versus Yeovil Town, equalising on the 74th minute mark at Huish Park in a 1–2 defeat. He continued his impressive early form over the following games; adding another assist in a 2–1 victory over Hartlepool United and his second goal in a 1–1 draw at home to Walsall. Poleon got a touch on the ball as it dribbled towards goal, with Poleon getting the final stroke before it nestled into the bottom corner against Portsmouth. On 19 November, Poleon's loan at Bury was extended until 3 January 2013 but he was recalled by his parent club only a day later due to suspensions and injuries. During Poleon's seven league games; the Shakers accumulated eleven points having previously only picked up four from their first ten.

Poleon was recalled by Leeds on 20 November due to injuries and suspensions at his parent club, coupled with his own good form at Bury. On 18 January 2013, Poleon signed a new two-and-a-half-year contract with Leeds.

Poleon joined Yorkshire rivals Sheffield United on loan until the end of the season on 12 February 2013. Blades boss Danny Wilson described Poleon as being "raw and unpredictable but very quick... he can get in behind the back of people and he can get a goal. We just feel he can add a little bit extra from the bench or even start." After playing seven times for Sheffield, Poleon was recalled by Leeds caretaker manager Neil Redfearn, after the departure of Neil Warnock.

Poleon scored his second goal for Leeds at Vicarage Road on the final day of the season in Leeds' 2–1 win against Watford after appearing as an early substitute for the injured Steve Morison. During this match Poleon was involved in a controversial collision in which he appeared to push Ikechi Anya, resulting in him accidentally colliding with goalkeeper Jonathan Bond, and earning himself a yellow card. Bond was rendered unconscious and was stretchered off the pitch with a suspected broken nose. Whilst the push was perceived as cynical by many opposing fans, he later posted on his official Twitter that he did not mean to injure the keeper and stressed he had no malicious intentions.

Poleon scored his first goal of the 2013–14 season on his first start, in a League Cup tie at home to Chesterfield. Poleon's goal proved to be the winner as Leeds won the game 2–1.

=== Oldham Athletic ===
On 1 September 2014, in the final hour of transfer deadline day, Poleon signed a two-year contract with Oldham Athletic for an undisclosed fee.

=== AFC Wimbledon ===
Poleon signed for AFC Wimbledon on 2 July 2016. He scored his first goals for Wimbledon when he scored twice in an EFL Trophy tie against Swansea City Under-23s on 30 August 2016.

=== Bradford City ===
He signed for Bradford City in June 2017 on a two-year deal.

=== Crawley Town ===
On 5 July 2018, Poleon agreed to join League Two side Crawley Town on a two-year deal for an undisclosed fee.

=== Newport County ===
Poleon's contract at Crawley was cancelled by mutual consent on 2 September 2019 to enable him to join League Two Newport County on the same day until the end of the 2019–20 season. He made his debut for Newport 14 September 2019 in the 2–0 defeat to Northampton Town as a second-half substitute.

On 30 January 2020, Poleon joined National League side Dover Athletic on loan until the end of the season. Poleon was released by Newport County at the end of the 2019–20 season.

=== Ebbsfleet United ===
On 9 February 2021, Poleon joined National League South side Ebbsfleet United on a free transfer following a successful trial period with the club.

A successful February 2023 where Poleon scored seven goals in seven matches, taking Ebbsfleet fourteen points clear of the team in second position, saw the striker win the National League South Player of the Month award. On 7 April 2023, he scored a fourth hat-trick of the season to take his league tally to thirty-six goals, securing a 3–0 victory over Oxford City to secure the National League South title and promotion back to the fifth tier. Having finished the season as top goalscorer, he was named the National League South Player of the Season.

He departed the club following relegation at the end of the 2024–25 season.

=== Farnborough ===
On 20 June 2025, Poleon joined National League South side Farnborough on a two-year deal.

=== Hornchurch ===
On 24 February 2026, Poleon joined fellow National League South side, Hornchurch for an undisclosed fee.

== International career ==
Poleon was born in England and is of Saint Lucian descent. On 16 June 2023, Poleon made his debut for the Saint Lucia national football team, in a 3–1 defeat to Martinique in the 2023 CONCACAF Gold Cup preliminary round. On 7 September 2023, he scored his first goals for his country with a hat-trick in a 5–1 victory over Sint Maarten.

== Career statistics ==
=== Club ===
Club	Season	League			FA Cup		League Cup		Other		Total	
Club	Season	Division	Apps	Goals	Apps	Goals	Apps	Goals	Apps	Goals	Apps	Goals
Leeds United	2012–13	Championship	6	2	0	0	2	0	—		8	2
Leeds United	2013–14	Championship	19	1	1	0	3	1	—		23	2
Leeds United	2014–15	Championship	4	0	0	0	2	0	—		6	0
Leeds United	Total		29	3	1	0	7	1	—		37	4
Bury (loan)	2012–13	League One	7	2	1	0	—		0	0	8	2
Sheffield United (loan)	2012–13	League One	7	0	—		—		0	0	7	0
Oldham Athletic	2014–15	League One	35	4	2	0	—		2 (Note: Appearance(s) in Football League Trophy)	2	39	6
Oldham Athletic	2015–16	League One	25	4	3	1	1	0	0	0	29	5
Oldham Athletic	Total		60	8	5	1	1	0	2	2	68	11
AFC Wimbledon	2016–17	League One	41	8	3	3	1	0	4 (Note: Appearance(s) in EFL Trophy)	2	49	13
Bradford City	2017–18	League One	32	6	2	0	1	1	2	0	37	7
Crawley Town	2018–19	League Two	30	5	1	0	1	0	3	1	35	6
Newport County	2019–20	League Two	5	0	3	0	0	0	4	0	12	0
Dover Athletic (loan)	2019–20	National League	6	1	—		—		0	0	6	1
Ebbsfleet United	2020–21	National League South	3	2	—		—		0	0	3	2
Ebbsfleet United	2021–22	National League South	40	17	2	0	—		2 (Note: Appearance(s) in National League South playoffs)	0	44	17
Ebbsfleet United	2022–23	National League South	43	36	3	1	—		0	0	46	37
Ebbsfleet United	2023–24	National League	39	16	2	0	—		1	0	42	16
Ebbsfleet United	2024–25	National League	27	5	0	0	—		2 (Note: Appearance(s) in National League Cup)	0	29	5
Ebbsfleet United	Total		152	76	7	1	0	0	5	0	164	77
Farnborough	2025–26	National League South	28	9	3	2	—		1 (Note: Appearance(s) in FA Trophy)	0	32	11
Hornchurch	2025–26	National League South	16	5	—		—		—		16	5
Hornchurch	2026-27	National League	7	2							7	2
Hornchurch	Total		23	7							23	7
Career total			405	122	26	7	11	2	21	5	463	136

=== International ===
As of match played 7 September 2023

National team	Year	Apps	Goals
Saint Lucia	2023	2	3
Total		2	3

=== International goals ===
Scores and results Saint Lucia's goal tally first.

No.	Date	Venue	Opponent	Score	Result	Competition
1	7 September 2023	Stadion Rignaal 'Jean' Francisca, Willemstad, Curaçao	Sint Maarten	1–0	5–1	2023–24 CONCACAF Nations League B
2	7 September 2023	Stadion Rignaal 'Jean' Francisca, Willemstad, Curaçao	Sint Maarten	2–0	5–1	2023–24 CONCACAF Nations League B
3	7 September 2023	Stadion Rignaal 'Jean' Francisca, Willemstad, Curaçao	Sint Maarten	5–1	5–1	2023–24 CONCACAF Nations League B

== Honours ==
Ebbsfleet United

- National League South: 2022–23

Hornchurch

- National League South play-offs: 2026

Individual

- National League South Player of the Month: February 2023
- National League South Player of the Season: 2022–23
- Ebbsfleet United Supporters' Player of the Season: 2022–23
- Ebbsfleet United Players' Player of the Season: 2022–23
