= Zac Thompson =

English footballer (born 1993)

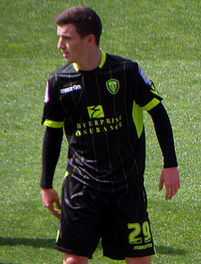
- Thompson playing for Leeds United in 2011

Personal information
- Full name: Zac Joseph Thompson
- Date of birth: 5 January 1993 (age 33)
- Place of birth: Higher End, England
- Height: 5 ft 10 in (1.78 m)
- Positions: Defender; midfielder

Youth career
- Everton

Senior career*
Years	Team	Apps	(Gls)
2011–2015	Leeds United	8	(0)
2012–2013	→ Bury (loan)	29	(1)
2015–2016	Guiseley	11	(0)
2016–2017	Marine	12	(1)
2017	St. Kilda		
2018	Altona City	9	(5)
2019–2020	Dandenong City	28	(7)
- * Club domestic league appearances and goals as of 19:54, 1 January 2021 (UTC)

Zac Joseph Thompson (born 5 January 1993) is an English footballer who plays as a defender or a midfielder.

== Early life ==
Born in Higher End, Greater Manchester, Thompson attended Byrchall High School in Ashton-in-Makerfield, where he completed his GCSEs.

== Career ==
=== Everton Academy ===
Thompson started his career at Premier League side Everton in the youth teams, joining aged 12 in 2005. He signed as a scholar after leaving school in the summer of 2009 but left eighteen months later after failing to earn a professional contract with the Toffees. He was offered the opportunity to join newly promoted Championship outfit Leeds United on trial by their manager Simon Grayson in late 2010.

=== Leeds United ===
After a successful trial, Thompson signed for Leeds on his first professional contract in January 2011, initially for six months. He played 19 games for Leeds for the reserves and youth team both before and after his trial period in 2010–11 and was rewarded with a 12-month extension to his current deal in April. The departure of key senior midfielders Neil Kilkenny and Bradley Johnson on free transfers to Bristol City and Norwich City respectively during the summer of 2011 would allow Thompson to stake a claim for a first team spot for United's second full season back in the second tier of English football.

In the 2011–12 pre-season, he broke through to Leeds first team, playing in several games for Leeds first team during the 2011–12 pre-season friendlies. He was named as an unused substitute against Bradford City on 9 August 2011 and made his debut four days later after coming on as a substitute for Robert Snodgrass in Leeds' 1–0 loss against Middlesbrough. Thompson made his full debut for Leeds on 23 August when he started against Doncaster Rovers in a 2–1 League Cup victory. After becoming a regular in Leeds' matchday squads, at the start of September, Thompson suffered an ankle injury which ruled him out for six-weeks.

After a promising start to the new season, Thompson was rewarded with a two-year deal midway through October. Thompson returned to the first team in the new year, making his first league start for Leeds against Burnley in a 2–1 victory on 2 January, playing in central midfield before being moved to right back after an injury to Patrick Kisnorbo. He retained his place in the starting line for the remaining four games of January, including an impressive defensive display away against Arsenal in the FA Cup, as Leeds slipped to a narrow 1–0 defeat after a late Thierry Henry strike. The last game of this run coincided with Simon Grayson's final game as manager before being sacked on the final day of the month; a 4–1 home defeat to Birmingham City on a January transfer deadline day that saw Leeds recruit competition for Thompson in the form of Tottenham Hotspur's youngster Adam Smith on loan. Thompson lost his place to Smith in the following game and caretaker manager Neil Redfearn first match in charge in what was a comfortable 3–0 victory away to Bristol City. Thompson would find his opportunities limited for the rest of the season whilst Leeds appointed former Queens Park Rangers manager Neil Warnock to replace Grayson.

After the expiration of Leeds' slim hopes of making the Play-Offs, Thompson returned to the first-team and made his first appearance under Warnock on 6 April 2012 away to Reading. He lasted 13 minutes in the game before being given a straight red card for a lunging challenge on Jobi McAnuff as a resilient Leeds side went down 0–2 to two late goals from Adam Le Fondre. He would cap his first professional senior with two further starts in a draw and a defeat against Cardiff City and Leicester City.

After appearing for the team in the pre-season summer 2012 schedule, Thompson found himself on the fringes of the squad for Warnock's first full season in charge as fellow young prospect Sam Byram leapfrogged him in the pecking order for the right sided position. Nevertheless, he made his first appearance of the 2012–13 season as a substitute in a League Cup match against Oxford United on 28 August as Leeds ran out 3–0 winners. Thompson signed a new three-year deal at the club on 2 October, with manager Neil Warnock predicting a bright future for the player at the club whilst reiterating the need for Thompson to gain valuable match experience from a loan spell in the lower leagues.

=== Bury loan move ===
On 15 October 2012, Thompson and teammate Dominic Poleon joined League One side Bury in a month-long loan deal. Both youngsters would be working under the newly appointed Bury manager Kevin Blackwell, who had a seventeen-year association with Warnock as player and coach between 1986 and 2003 and had managed Thompson's parent club between 2004 and 2006. He was assigned the number 33 shirt and made his debut for the Shakers in the home game versus Carlisle United. He scored his first professional goal from a Poleon assist in the game on the 36th minute as Bury registered a 1–1 draw after conceding a late equaliser. The energy and commitment of the youngsters lead to instant praise from Blackwell after the game; observing that "the two young lads from Leeds were absolutely out on their feet after that. For them, the warm up matters, every time they train matters, when they travel in – it matters and I'm really pleased with both of them, the whole team."

In the following game versus Yeovil Town at Huish Park, Thompson was given a straight red card on 27 minutes after a two-footed lunge on Keanu Marsh-Brown as ten-men Bury went down 2–1. It was the second time in only nine professional starts that the youngster had received a straight red card. He missed the following three games through suspension, including the FA Cup 1st round victory over Exeter City.

Thompson's loan at Bury was further extended on 19 November until 3 January 2013 and then again till the end of the season later that month. Despite being in the Bury side that suffered relegation to League Two, Thompson's own impressive performances earned him the Bury Young Player of The Year Award at the club's end of season awards.

=== Return to Leeds ===
Thompson was named in the starting lineup for Leeds in their final game of the 2012–13 season, against Watford. However, an unforeseen clause in his loan deal at Bury forced his replacement by Michael Brown prior to kickoff. The game ended as a 2–1 victory for the Yorkshire side.

After mainly featuring in the development squad for the 2014–15 season, on 13 May 2015 upon the expiry of his contract, Leeds announced that he would be released.

After playing for Guiseley and Marine, Thompson moved to Australia where he played for Victorian State League Division 1 side St. Kilda and then National Premier Leagues Victoria 2 side Altona City.

== Career statistics ==
As of match played 18 December 2012

Appearances and goals by club, season and competition
Season	Club	League			FA Cup		League Cup		Play-offs		Total	
Season	Club	Division	Apps	Goals	Apps	Goals	Apps	Goals	Apps	Goals	Apps	Goals
Bury	2012–13	League One	19	1	2	1	1	0	–		22	2
Leeds United	2012–13	Championship	0	0	0	0	1	0	–		1	0
Leeds United	2011–12	Championship	9	0	1	0	1	0	–		11	0
Leeds United	Total		8	0	1	0	2	0	0	0	11	0
Career total			28	1	3	2	2	0	0	0	33	2

== Honours ==
Personal

- Bury Young Player of the Season Award: 2012–13
