= Lewis Turner =

English footballer (born 1992)

Lewis Kristian Turner
Personal information
- Date of birth: 3 September 1992 (age 34)
- Place of birth: Garforth, England
- Position: Right-back

Youth career
- 2001–2011: Leeds United

Senior career*
Years	Team	Apps	(Gls)
2011–2014	Leeds United	0	(0)
2012	→ Harrogate Town (loan)	8	(1)
2013–2014	→ Chester (loan)	43	(2)
2014–2017	Harrogate Town	98	(1)
2017–2020	Farsley Celtic	7+	(1+)
2020	Matlock Town	0	(0)
2020–2021	Scarborough Athletic	15	(1)
2021–2025	Farsley Celtic	95	(3)
2024	→ Ossett United (loan)	6	(0)
- * Club domestic league appearances and goals as of 22:37, 14 July 2025 (UTC)

Lewis Kristian Turner (born 3 September 1992) is an English professional footballer who plays as a right-back; he is currently a free agent.

== Career ==
=== Leeds United ===
Lewis Turner and his brother Nathan were products of the Leeds United Academy and Lewis Turner went to Boston Spa Academy. He signed his first professional contract for the club on 1 July 2011 and was an unused substitute during a 2–1 victory against Doncaster Rovers during the Football League Cup.

==== Loans to Harrogate Town and Chester ====
Turner would then go out on loan to Harrogate Town in 2012 and scored his first career goal during a 1–0 win against Boston United. Alongside his brother, he would be loaned out again to Chester for the 2013–14 season.

=== Harrogate Town ===
In July 2014, Turner joined Harrogate Town on a free transfer and would make almost one-hundred league appearances for the club.

=== First spell at Farsley Celtic ===
He joined Farsley Celtic in July 2017 for his first spell at the club and he would once again play alongside his brother Nathan at club level. He would play three seasons at the club and was part of the team which won the Northern Premier League title in May 2019, although he was injured partway into the season.

=== Matlock Town ===
He then left to join Matlock Town on a one-month deal between August and September 2020. He made two competitive appearances for Matlock Town against OJM Black Country and Quorn, both in the FA Cup.

=== Scarborough Athletic ===
He then joined Scarborough Athletic on a deal lasting between September 2020 and September 2021. He made his debut for Scarborough Athletic on 29 September 2020 during the 3–0 win against Stalybridge Celtic.

=== Second spell at Farsley Celtic ===
He returned to Farsley Celtic on 22 September 2021.

During his second spell at Farsley Celtic, he became the club captain and has finished one place above the relegation zone in the National League North during all of his seasons during his second spell at Farsley Celtic.

On 11 December 2024, Turner suffered a cardiac arrest during an FA Trophy third round match against Gateshead which saw the game rescheduled. He later regained consciousness and has begun his recovery process.

He left Farsley Celtic on 1 July 2025 and the club was liquidated shortly after.

==== Loan to Ossett United ====
Alongside Joao Silva, Turner was loaned out to Ossett United between January and February 2024, making seven appearances across all competitions.

== Honours ==
Farsley Celtic

- Northern Premier League: 2018–19
