= 2013–14 Football League Championship =

Football League Championship
- Season: 2013–14
- Champions: Leicester City; 1st Championship title 7th 2nd tier title
- Promoted: Leicester City; Burnley; Queens Park Rangers
- Relegated: Doncaster Rovers; Barnsley; Yeovil Town
- Matches: 552
- Goals: 1,434 (2.6 per match)
- Top goalscorer: 28 goals Ross McCormack (Leeds United)
- Biggest home win: Reading 7–1 Bolton Wanderers; Sheffield Wednesday 6–0 Leeds United
- Biggest away win: Barnsley 0–4 Wigan Athletic; Millwall 1–5 Derby County; Barnsley 1–5 Watford; Leeds United 1–5 Bolton Wanderers
- Highest scoring: Derby County 4–4 Ipswich Town; Leicester City 5–3 Bolton Wanderers; Reading 7–1 Bolton Wanderers
- Longest winning run: 9 games Leicester City
- Longest unbeaten run: 21 games Leicester City
- Longest winless run: 17 games Blackpool
- Longest losing run: 5 games Birmingham City; Leeds United
- Highest attendance: 33,432; Leeds United vs Brighton
- Lowest attendance: 4,463; Yeovil Town vs Millwall
- Average attendance: 16,555

The 2013–14 Football League Championship (referred to as the Sky Bet Championship for sponsorship reasons) was the tenth season of the Football League Championship under its current title, the twenty-first season under its current league division format and marked the 125th anniversary of the Football League's inaugural season. The season started on 3 August 2013 and finished on 3 May 2014, with all matches on the final day kicking off simultaneously.

== Changes from last season ==
=== Team changes ===
The following teams changed divisions after the 2012–13 season.

==== To Championship ====
Promoted from League One

- AFC Bournemouth
- Doncaster Rovers
- Yeovil Town

Relegated from Premier League

- Queens Park Rangers
- Reading
- Wigan Athletic

==== From Championship ====
Relegated to League One

- Bristol City
- Peterborough United
- Wolverhampton Wanderers

Promoted to Premier League

- Cardiff City
- Hull City
- Crystal Palace

=== Rule changes ===
Changes to the Championship's financial fair play system allow clubs:

- Acceptable losses of £3 million during the 2013–14 season (down from £4 million during the 2012–13 season)
- Acceptable shareholder equity investment of £5 million during the 2013–14 season (down from £6 million during the 2012–13 season).
- Sanctions for exceeding the allowances take effect from the set of accounts relating to the 2013–14 season which are due to be submitted on 1 December 2014.

== Teams ==
Of the 24 participating teams, eighteen remain following the 2012–13 Football League Championship. They are joined by three teams promoted from the 2012–13 Football League One and three relegated from the 2012–13 Premier League.

On 20 April 2013, Bournemouth were promoted to the Championship after Brentford's 1–1 draw with Hartlepool. A week later, Doncaster were promoted as champions of League One after scoring a late goal against Brentford. This pushed Bournemouth down to second place. On 19 May, Yeovil Town won promotion by beating Brentford in the 2013 Football League One play-off final.

On 28 April 2013, Queens Park Rangers and Reading were both relegated from the Premier League after a goalless draw against each other. On 14 May, Wigan Athletic were relegated from the Premier League after a 4–1 defeat at Arsenal.

== Team overview ==
Locations of teams in the 2013–14 Football League Championship

=== Stadium and locations ===
Team	Location	Stadium	Capacity
Barnsley	Barnsley	Oakwell	23,009
Birmingham City	Birmingham	St Andrew's	30,016
Blackburn Rovers	Blackburn	Ewood Park	31,154
Blackpool	Blackpool	Bloomfield Road	17,338
Bolton Wanderers	Horwich	Reebok Stadium	28,100
Bournemouth	Bournemouth	Dean Court	11,364
Brighton & Hove Albion	Brighton	Falmer Stadium	30,750
Burnley	Burnley	Turf Moor	22,546
Charlton Athletic	London (Charlton)	The Valley	27,111
Derby County	Derby	Pride Park	33,597
Doncaster Rovers	Doncaster	Keepmoat Stadium	15,231
Huddersfield Town	Huddersfield	John Smith's Stadium	24,500
Ipswich Town	Ipswich	Portman Road	30,311
Leeds United	Leeds	Elland Road	39,460
Leicester City	Leicester	King Power Stadium	32,262
Middlesbrough	Middlesbrough	Riverside Stadium	34,742
Millwall	London (South Bermondsey)	The Den	20,146
Nottingham Forest	Nottingham	City Ground	30,576
Queens Park Rangers	London (White City)	Loftus Road	18,360
Reading	Reading	Madejski Stadium	24,224
Sheffield Wednesday	Sheffield	Hillsborough	39,812
Watford	Watford	Vicarage Road	17,477
Wigan Athletic	Wigan	DW Stadium	25,133
Yeovil Town	Yeovil	Huish Park	9,565

Source: Football Ground Guide.

=== Personnel and sponsoring ===
Team	Manager^{1}	Chairman	Team captain	Kit Manufacturer	Sponsor
Barnsley	(Northern Ireland) Danny Wilson	(England) Maurice Watkins	(England) Bobby Hassell	Nike	C.K. Beckett
Birmingham City	(England) Lee Clark	(England) Peter Pannu	(England) Paul Robinson	Diadora	Nicolites
Blackburn Rovers	(England) Gary Bowyer	Vacant	(Scotland) Grant Hanley	Nike	RFS
Blackpool	(Scotland) Barry Ferguson (interim)	(England) Karl Oyston	(Spain) Ángel Martínez	Erreà	Wonga
Bolton Wanderers	(Scotland) Dougie Freedman	(England) Phil Gartside	(England) Zat Knight	adidas	FibrLec
Bournemouth	(England) Eddie Howe	(England) Eddie Mitchell (Russia) Maxim Demin	(England) Tommy Elphick	Fila	Energy Consulting
Brighton & Hove Albion	(Spain) Óscar García	(England) Tony Bloom	(Scotland) Gordon Greer	Erreà	American Express
Burnley	(England) Sean Dyche	(England) Mike Garlick (England) John Banaszkiewicz	(England) Jason Shackell	Puma	Premier Range
Charlton Athletic	(Belgium) José Riga	(England) Richard Murray	(England) Johnnie Jackson	Nike	Andrews Air-conditioning
Derby County	(England) Steve McClaren	(United States) Andrew Appleby	(England) Shaun Barker	Kappa	buymobiles.net
Doncaster Rovers	(Scotland) Paul Dickov	Vacant	(England) Rob Jones	Just Sport	One Call Insurance
Huddersfield Town	(England) Mark Robins	(England) Dean Hoyle	(England) Peter Clarke	Puma	Rekorderlig Cider (H); RadianB (A); Cavonia (3rd)
Ipswich Town	(Republic of Ireland) Mick McCarthy	(England) Marcus Evans	(Trinidad and Tobago) Carlos Edwards	Mitre	Marcus Evans
Leeds United	(England) Brian McDermott	(Bahrain) Salah Nooruddin	(Scotland) Ross McCormack	Macron	Enterprise Insurance (front); Help Link Direct (back)
Leicester City	(England) Nigel Pearson	(Thailand) Vichai Srivaddhanaprabha	(Jamaica) Wes Morgan	Puma	King Power (front); Amazing Thailand (back)
Middlesbrough	(Spain) Aitor Karanka	(England) Steve Gibson	(England) Jonathan Woodgate	adidas	Ramsdens
Millwall	(England) Ian Holloway	(United States) John Berylson	(England) Paul Robinson	Macron	Prostate Cancer UK
Nottingham Forest	(England) Gary Brazil (caretaker)	(Kuwait) Fawaz Al-Hasawi	(England) Chris Cohen	adidas	Fawaz International Refrigeration & Air Conditioning Company
Queens Park Rangers	(England) Harry Redknapp	(Malaysia) Tony Fernandes	(England) Clint Hill	Lotto	AirAsia
Reading	(England) Nigel Adkins	(England) Sir John Madejski	(England) Jobi McAnuff	Puma	Waitrose (front); Marussia F1 (rear)
Sheffield Wednesday	(England) Stuart Gray	(Serbia) Milan Mandarić	(England) Anthony Gardner	Puma	Front Home: WANdisco; Bartercard (front away); GCI Com (back)
Watford	(Italy) Giuseppe Sannino	(Italy) Gino Pozzo	(Spain) Manuel Almunia	Puma	138.com (front); Football Manager (back)
Wigan Athletic	(Germany) Uwe Rösler	(England) Dave Whelan	(Scotland) Gary Caldwell	MiFit	12BET
Yeovil Town	(England) Gary Johnson	(England) John Fry	(Scotland) Jamie McAllister	Sondico	W+S Recycling

- ^{1} According to current revision of List of English Football League managers

==== Managerial changes ====
Team	Outgoing manager	Manner of departure	Date of vacancy	Position in table	Incoming manager	Date of appointment
Doncaster Rovers	(Wales) Brian Flynn	End of contract	3 May 2013	Pre-season	(Scotland) Paul Dickov	20 May 2013
Millwall	(Wales) Kenny Jackett	Resigned	7 May 2013	Pre-season	(Northern Ireland) Steve Lomas	6 June 2013
Wigan Athletic	(Spain) Roberto Martínez	Signed by Everton	3 June 2013	Pre-season	(Republic of Ireland) Owen Coyle	14 June 2013
Brighton & Hove Albion	(Uruguay) Gus Poyet	Sacked	23 June 2013	Pre-season	(Spain) Óscar García	26 June 2013
Derby County	(England) Nigel Clough	Sacked	28 September 2013	14th	(England) Steve McClaren	30 September 2013
Middlesbrough	(England) Tony Mowbray	Sacked	21 October 2013	16th	(Spain) Aitor Karanka	13 November 2013
Barnsley	(England) David Flitcroft	Sacked	30 November 2013	24th	(Northern Ireland) Danny Wilson	17 December 2013
Sheffield Wednesday	(England) Dave Jones	Sacked	1 December 2013	23rd	(England) Stuart Gray	25 January 2014
Wigan Athletic	(Republic of Ireland) Owen Coyle	Sacked	2 December 2013	14th	(Germany) Uwe Rösler	7 December 2013
Watford	(Italy) Gianfranco Zola	Resigned	16 December 2013	13th	(Italy) Giuseppe Sannino	18 December 2013
Millwall	(Northern Ireland) Steve Lomas	Sacked	26 December 2013	20th	(England) Ian Holloway	6 January 2014
Blackpool	(England) Paul Ince	Sacked	21 January 2014	14th	(Scotland) Barry Ferguson	4 March 2014
Charlton Athletic	(England) Chris Powell	Sacked	11 March 2014	24th	(Belgium) José Riga	11 March 2014
Nottingham Forest	(Scotland) Billy Davies	Sacked	24 March 2014	7th	(England) Stuart Pearce	1 July 2014

== League table ==
Pos	Team	Pld	W	D	L	GF	GA	GD	Pts	Promotion, qualification or relegation
1	Leicester City (C, P)	46	31	9	6	83	43	+40	102	Promotion to the Premier League
2	Burnley (P)	46	26	15	5	72	37	+35	93	Promotion to the Premier League
3	Derby County	46	25	10	11	84	52	+32	85	Qualification for Championship play-offs
4	Queens Park Rangers (O, P)	46	23	11	12	60	44	+16	80	Qualification for Championship play-offs
5	Wigan Athletic	46	21	10	15	61	48	+13	73	Qualification for Championship play-offs
6	Brighton & Hove Albion	46	19	15	12	55	40	+15	72	Qualification for Championship play-offs
7	Reading	46	19	14	13	70	56	+14	71	
8	Blackburn Rovers	46	18	16	12	70	62	+8	70	
9	Ipswich Town	46	18	14	14	60	54	+6	68	
10	Bournemouth	46	18	12	16	67	66	+1	66	
11	Nottingham Forest	46	16	17	13	67	64	+3	65	
12	Middlesbrough	46	16	16	14	62	50	+12	64	
13	Watford	46	15	15	16	74	64	+10	60	
14	Bolton Wanderers	46	14	17	15	59	60	−1	59	
15	Leeds United	46	16	9	21	59	67	−8	57	
16	Sheffield Wednesday	46	13	14	19	63	65	−2	53	
17	Huddersfield Town	46	14	11	21	58	65	−7	53	
18	Charlton Athletic	46	13	12	21	41	61	−20	51	
19	Millwall	46	11	15	20	46	74	−28	48	
20	Blackpool	46	11	13	22	38	66	−28	46	
21	Birmingham City	46	11	11	24	58	74	−16	44	
22	Doncaster Rovers (R)	46	11	11	24	39	70	−31	44	Relegation to Football League One
23	Barnsley (R)	46	9	12	25	44	77	−33	39	Relegation to Football League One
24	Yeovil Town (R)	46	8	13	25	44	75	−31	37	Relegation to Football League One

Source: BBC Sport
Rules for classification: 1) points; 2) goal difference; 3) number of goals scored
(C) Champions; (O) Play-off winners; (P) Promoted; (R) Relegated

== Play-offs ==
Semifinals
3	Derby County	2	4	6
6	Brighton & Hove Albion	1	1	2
4	QPR (a.e.t.)	0	2	2
5	Wigan	0	1	1

Final
3	Derby County	0
4	QPR	1

== Results ==
Home \ Away	BAR	BIR	BLB	BLP	BOL	BOU	B&HA	BUR	CHA	DER	DON	HUD	IPS	LEE	LEI	MID	MIL	NOT	QPR	REA	SHW	WAT	WIG	YEO
Barnsley		0–3	2–2	2–0	0–1	0–1	0–0	0–1	2–2	1–2	0–0	2–1	2–2	0–1	0–3	3–2	1–0	1–0	2–3	1–1	1–1	1–5	0–4	1–1
Birmingham City	1–1		2–4	1–1	1–2	2–4	0–1	3–3	0–1	3–3	1–1	1–2	1–1	1–3	1–2	2–2	4–0	0–0	0–2	1–2	4–1	0–1	0–1	0–2
Blackburn Rovers	5–2	2–3		2–0	4–1	0–1	3–3	1–2	0–1	1–1	1–0	0–0	2–0	1–0	1–1	1–0	3–2	0–1	2–0	0–0	0–0	1–0	4–3	0–0
Blackpool	1–0	1–2	2–2		0–0	0–1	0–1	0–1	0–3	1–3	1–1	1–0	2–3	1–1	2–2	0–2	1–0	1–1	0–2	1–0	2–0	1–0	1–0	1–2
Bolton Wanderers	1–0	2–2	4–0	1–0		2–2	0–2	0–1	1–1	2–2	3–0	0–1	1–1	0–1	0–1	2–2	3–1	1–1	0–1	1–1	1–1	2–0	1–1	1–1
Bournemouth	1–0	0–2	1–3	1–2	0–2		1–1	1–1	2–1	0–1	5–0	2–1	1–1	4–1	0–1	0–0	5–2	4–1	2–1	3–1	2–4	1–1	1–0	3–0
Brighton & Hove Albion	1–2	1–0	3–0	1–1	3–1	1–1		2–0	3–0	1–2	1–0	0–0	0–2	1–0	3–1	0–2	1–1	1–3	2–0	1–1	1–1	1–1	1–2	2–0
Burnley	1–0	3–0	1–1	2–1	1–1	1–1	0–0		3–0	2–0	2–0	3–2	1–0	2–1	0–2	0–1	3–1	3–1	2–0	2–1	1–1	0–0	2–0	2–0
Charlton Athletic	1–2	0–2	1–3	0–0	0–0	1–0	3–2	0–3		0–2	2–0	0–0	0–1	2–4	2–1	0–1	0–1	1–1	1–0	0–1	1–1	3–1	0–0	3–2
Derby County	2–1	1–1	1–1	5–1	0–0	1–0	1–0	0–3	3–0		3–1	3–1	4–4	3–1	0–1	2–1	0–1	5–0	1–0	1–3	3–0	4–2	0–1	3–2
Doncaster Rovers	2–2	1–3	2–0	1–3	1–2	0–1	1–3	0–2	3–0	0–2		2–0	0–3	0–3	1–0	0–0	0–0	2–2	2–1	1–3	1–0	2–1	3–0	2–1
Huddersfield Town	5–0	1–3	2–4	1–1	0–1	5–1	1–1	2–1	2–1	1–1	0–0		0–2	3–2	0–2	2–2	1–0	0–3	1–1	0–1	0–2	1–2	1–0	5–1
Ipswich Town	1–1	1–0	3–1	0–0	1–0	2–2	2–0	0–1	1–1	2–1	2–1	2–1		1–2	1–2	3–1	3–0	1–1	1–3	2–0	2–1	1–1	1–3	2–1
Leeds United	0–0	4–0	1–2	2–0	1–5	2–1	2–1	1–2	0–1	1–1	1–2	5–1	1–1		0–1	2–1	2–1	0–2	0–1	2–4	1–1	3–3	2–0	2–0
Leicester City	2–1	3–2	2–1	3–1	5–3	2–1	1–4	1–1	3–0	4–1	1–0	2–1	3–0	0–0		2–0	3–0	0–2	1–0	1–0	2–1	2–2	2–0	1–1
Middlesbrough	3–1	3–1	0–0	1–1	1–0	3–3	0–1	1–0	1–0	1–0	4–0	1–1	2–0	0–0	1–2		1–2	1–1	1–3	3–0	1–1	2–2	0–0	4–1
Millwall	1–0	2–3	2–2	3–1	1–1	1–0	0–1	2–2	0–0	1–5	0–0	0–1	1–0	2–0	1–3	0–2		2–2	2–2	0–3	1–1	2–2	2–1	0–1
Nottingham Forest	3–2	1–0	4–1	0–1	3–0	1–1	1–2	1–1	0–1	1–0	0–0	1–0	0–0	2–1	2–2	2–2	1–2		2–0	2–3	3–3	4–2	1–4	3–1
Queens Park Rangers	2–0	1–0	0–0	1–1	2–1	3–0	0–0	3–3	1–0	2–1	2–1	2–1	1–0	1–1	0–1	2–0	1–1	5–2		1–3	2–1	2–1	1–0	3–0
Reading	1–3	2–0	0–1	5–1	7–1	1–2	0–0	2–2	1–0	0–0	4–1	1–1	2–1	1–0	1–1	2–0	1–1	1–1	1–1		0–2	3–3	1–2	1–1
Sheffield Wednesday	1–0	4–1	3–3	2–0	1–3	1–2	1–0	1–2	2–3	0–1	0–1	1–2	1–1	6–0	2–1	1–0	2–2	0–1	3–0	5–2		1–4	0–3	1–1
Watford	3–0	1–0	3–3	4–0	0–1	6–1	2–0	1–1	1–1	2–3	2–1	1–4	3–1	3–0	0–3	1–0	4–0	1–1	0–0	0–1	0–1		1–0	0–3
Wigan Athletic	2–0	0–0	2–1	0–2	3–2	3–0	0–1	0–0	2–1	1–3	2–2	2–1	2–0	1–0	2–2	2–2	0–1	2–1	0–0	3–0	1–0	2–1		3–3
Yeovil Town	1–4	0–1	0–1	1–0	2–2	1–1	0–0	1–2	2–2	0–3	1–0	1–2	0–1	1–2	1–2	1–4	1–1	3–1	0–1	0–1	2–0	0–0	0–1	

Updated to match(es) played on 3 May 2014. Source: http://www.football-league.co.uk/page/ResultsSearch/0,,10794~201300007,00.html
Legend: Blue = home team win; Yellow = draw; Red = away team win.

== Season statistics ==
=== Top scorers ===
As of 12 May 2014.

Rank	Player	Club	Goals
1	(Scotland) Ross McCormack	Leeds United	28
2	(Scotland) Jordan Rhodes	Blackburn Rovers	25
3	(England) Troy Deeney	Watford	24
4	(England) Danny Ings	Burnley	22
4	(England) Lewis Grabban	AFC Bournemouth	22
4	(Scotland) Chris Martin^{1}	Derby County	22
7	(England) David Nugent	Leicester City	20
7	(Wales) Sam Vokes	Burnley	20
9	(England) Charlie Austin^{1}	Queens Park Rangers	19
10	(Scotland) Craig Bryson	Derby County	16
10	(England) Jamie Vardy	Leicester City	16

1. - includes 2 goals in the play-offs

=== Penalties ===
As of 12 May 2014.

Rank	Player	Club	Scored
1	(England) David Nugent	Leicester City	9
2	(England) Lewis Grabban	AFC Bournemouth	7
3	(England) Troy Deeney	Watford	6
4	(Scotland) Chris Martin^{1}	Derby County	5
4	(England) Charlie Austin^{1}	Queens Park Rangers	5
6	(England) Chris O'Grady	Barnsley	4
6	(Scotland) Jordan Rhodes	Blackburn Rovers	4
6	(Wales) Sam Vokes	Burnley	4

1. - includes 1 penalty in the play-offs

=== Hat-tricks ===
As of 3 May 2014.

#.	Player	Club	Against	Score	Date
1	(England) Troy Deeney	Watford	AFC Bournemouth	6–1	10 August 2013
2	(England) James Vaughan	Huddersfield Town	AFC Bournemouth	5–1	24 August 2013
3	(Scotland) Craig Bryson	Derby County	Millwall	1–5	14 September 2013
4	(England) Jesse Lingard^{4}	Birmingham City	Sheffield Wednesday	4–1	21 September 2013
5	(Scotland) Ross McCormack^{4}	Leeds United	Charlton Athletic	2–4	9 November 2013
6	(Scotland) Chris Martin	Derby County	Blackpool	5–1	7 December 2013
7	(England) Adam Le Fondre	Reading	Bolton Wanderers	7–1	18 January 2014
8	(England) Adam Le Fondre	Reading	Blackpool	5–1	28 January 2014
9	(Scotland) Ross McCormack	Leeds United	Huddersfield Town	5–1	1 February 2014
10	(France) Yann Kermorgant	AFC Bournemouth	Doncaster Rovers	5–0	1 March 2014
11	(Scotland) Jordan Rhodes	Blackburn Rovers	Huddersfield Town	2–4	15 March 2014
12	(Scotland) Craig Bryson	Derby County	Nottingham Forest	5–0	22 March 2014
13	(Benin) Rudy Gestede	Blackburn Rovers	Birmingham City	2–4	21 April 2014
14	(England) Marvin Sordell	Charlton Athletic	Sheffield Wednesday	2–3	21 April 2014
15	(England) Danny Ward	Huddersfield Town	Watford	1–4	3 May 2014
16	(Guyana) Callum Harriott	Charlton Athletic	Blackpool	0–3	3 May 2014

- ^{4} Player scored 4 goals

=== Scoring ===
- First goal: Danny Ings for Burnley against Bolton Wanderers (3 August 2013)
- Fastest goal: 15 seconds, David Goodwillie for Blackpool against Derby County (8 April 2014)
- Widest winning margin: 6 goals
  - Sheffield Wednesday 6–0 Leeds United (11 January 2014)
  - Reading 7–1 Bolton Wanderers (18 January 2014)
- Highest scoring game: 8 goals
  - Derby County 4–4 Ipswich Town (1 October 2013)
  - Leicester City 5–3 Bolton Wanderers (29 December 2013)
  - Reading 7–1 Bolton Wanderers (18 January 2014)
- Most goals scored in a match by a single team: 7 goals
  - Reading 7–1 Bolton Wanderers (18 January 2014)
- Most goals scored in a match by a losing team: 3 goals
  - Leicester City 5–3 Bolton Wanderers (29 December 2013)
  - Blackburn Rovers 4–3 Wigan Athletic (3 May 2014)

=== Abandoned games ===
- Charlton Athletic 1–3 Doncaster Rovers (24 August 2013)
  ~ Charlton Athletic 2–0 Doncaster Rovers (Replay)
- Sheffield Wednesday 0–1 Wigan Athletic (18 December 2013)
  ~ Sheffield Wednesday 0–3 Wigan Athletic (Replay)

== Monthly awards ==
Month	Manager of the Month		Player of the Month		Reference
Month	Manager	Club	Player	Club	Reference
August	(England) Paul Ince	Blackpool	(England) James Vaughan	Huddersfield Town	
September	(England) Sean Dyche	Burnley	(Republic of Ireland) David McGoldrick	Ipswich Town	
October	(England) Sean Dyche	Burnley	(England) Danny Ings	Burnley	
November	(Spain) Óscar Garcia	Brighton & Hove Albion	(Scotland) Ross McCormack	Leeds United	
December	(England) Steve McClaren	Derby County	(England) Danny Drinkwater	Leicester City	
January	(England) Nigel Pearson	Leicester City	(England) Adam Le Fondre	Reading	
February	(Germany) Uwe Rösler	Wigan Athletic	(Wales) Sam Vokes	Burnley	
March	(England) Nigel Pearson	Leicester City	(Jamaica) Ravel Morrison	Queens Park Rangers	
April	(England) Sean Dyche	Burnley	(Benin) Rudy Gestede	Blackburn Rovers	

== Attendances ==
No.	Club	Average	Change	Highest	Lowest
1	Brighton & Hove Albion	27,283	4.0%	29,093	25,725
2	Leeds United	25,088	16.3%	33,432	17,343
3	Leicester City	24,995	13.3%	31,424	19,153
4	Derby County	24,933	7.3%	33,004	21,037
5	Nottingham Forest	22,630	-2.0%	28,276	17,951
6	Sheffield Wednesday	21,239	-11.8%	25,279	18,029
7	Reading	19,171	-19.7%	23,335	16,636
8	Ipswich Town	17,111	-2.4%	20,862	14,953
9	Queens Park Rangers	16,656	-6.3%	18,171	14,649
10	Bolton Wanderers	16,141	-10.5%	19,622	14,260
11	Charlton Athletic	16,134	-12.8%	23,600	12,974
12	Middlesbrough	15,748	-6.2%	23,679	12,793
13	Watford	15,512	15.3%	16,625	13,904
14	Birmingham City	15,458	-7.5%	23,497	12,663
15	Wigan Athletic	15,177	-21.6%	19,226	12,709
16	Blackburn Rovers	14,962	-0.2%	21,589	12,332
17	Blackpool	14,217	2.2%	16,098	12,280
18	Huddersfield Town	14,213	-5.1%	18,309	11,857
19	Burnley	13,719	6.1%	19,125	9,641
20	Barnsley	11,557	13.2%	16,338	9,084
21	Millwall	11,063	4.8%	16,102	8,415
22	AFC Bournemouth	9,952	45.2%	11,307	7,258
23	Doncaster Rovers	9,041	24.9%	12,609	6,454
24	Yeovil Town	6,616	62.5%	9,108	4,463
