= Ken Bates =

British businessman (1931–2026)

- Bates in 1990
- Born: Kenneth William Bates; 4 December 1931; Richmond, Surrey, England
- Died: 11 July 2026 (aged 94); Monaco
- Occupations: Businessman; football executive; hotelier
- Known for: Chairman and owner of Leeds United and Chelsea

Kenneth William Bates (4 December 1931 – 11 July 2026) was a British businessman, football executive and hotelier. He was involved in the development of Wembley Stadium and was an owner and chairman of football clubs Chelsea and Leeds United.

Bates spent five years as chairman of Oldham Athletic during the 1960s and also had a spell at Wigan Athletic. In 1982, he purchased Chelsea for £1. During his tenure, he helped the club win a long-running battle with property developers who were attempting to evict them from their Stamford Bridge home. By the end of his reign, Chelsea were regularly finishing in the top six of the Premier League and had won their first major trophies since the 1970s, although they had a debt burden of around £80 million. In July 2003, he sold the club to Russian billionaire Roman Abramovich from whom he received approximately £18 million.

In January 2005, Bates bought a 50% stake in Leeds United, another club struggling under a heavy debt burden. In May 2007, Leeds entered administration, and were relegated to League One. The club regained Championship status in 2010 and, in May 2011, it was confirmed that Bates had become the sole owner. In November 2012, Bates sold his holdings in Leeds United to GFH Capital.

== Life and career ==
=== Early life ===
Kenneth William Bates was born in Richmond, Surrey on 4 December 1931. His mother died shortly afterwards and his father absconded, so he was raised by his grandparents in a council flat. He grew up supporting Queens Park Rangers but was unsuccessful in pursuing a playing career in football. He made his personal fortune in the haulage industry and later moved into quarrying, ready-mix concrete and dairy farming.

Bates was involved with various other enterprises during the 1960s and 1970s, including projects on the British Virgin Islands and in Rhodesia. The Leeds United fanzine Square Ball has published a photograph of Bates with Rhodesian PM Ian Smith during a 1967 tour by Oldham Athletic, when Rhodesia was subject to UN sanctions.

=== British Virgin Islands ===
Square Ball has reported, having worked with a documentary made in the British Virgin Islands, that Bates attempted to obtain control and develop most of the island of Anegada near Tortola on a 199-year lease, but was thwarted after protests by islanders caused the local government to change its decision and investigations began by the British government. Bates agreement included paying to dredge Tortola's Roadtown Harbor and create and develop land around Wickams Cay in the vicinity. The original agreement to lease the island was known as the Bates–Hill Agreement. Today, a park on Tortola is named after Noel Lloyd, a resident of the island who led the opposition to the agreement.

In 1976, he set up the Irish Trust Bank, but it wound up leaving thousands of investors out-of-pocket.

=== Oldham and Wigan ===
After having been chairman of Oldham Athletic for five years in the 1960s, in 1980 Bates became co-owner and vice chairman of Wigan Athletic with his old business associate Freddie Pye. He provided significant finance by way of bank guarantees that enabled the then manager, Larry Lloyd, to sign a number of players, not the least of which was Eamonn O'Keefe from Everton for £65,000. Wigan duly gained promotion under Lloyd to the Third Division in May 1982.

=== Chelsea ===
Later in 1982, Bates purchased Chelsea for £1. When he purchased the club they were in serious financial trouble, as well as being tarnished by a notorious hooligan element among their support. They were also struggling in the Football League Second Division, a stark contrast to their successful era from 1955 to 1971, when they had won a Football League First Division title, an FA Cup, Football League Cup and European Cup Winners' Cup. After narrowly escaping relegation to the Third Division in the 1982–83 season, Bates made the funds available to manager John Neal to sign players including Kerry Dixon, David Speedie, Pat Nevin, Mickey Thomas, Eddie Niedzwiecki and Nigel Spackman, who helped the club win promotion and re-establish themselves in the top-flight with consecutive top six finishes.

Chelsea has spent all but one season in the top flight of English football since 1984, and by the time Bates stepped down as chairman in 2003 they were firmly re-established as one of English football's leading sides, having achieved seven successive top six finishes in the Premier League and won several major trophies as well as signing a succession of high-profile players, including many foreign international stars.

In the early years, he fought a successful and long-running legal battle with property developers, Marler Estates, who had purchased a substantial portion of the freehold of Stamford Bridge, Chelsea's home ground. He re-united the freehold with the club (and thus secured its future) after Marler's bankruptcy following a market crash, which allowed him to do a deal with their banks and create the Chelsea Pitch Owners, an organisation set-up to stave off future developers and attempted to make the club more financially viable. He also had Stamford Bridge rebuilt as an all-seater stadium by 1995, and by 2001 it had a capacity of more than 42,000.

In the mid-1980s, he famously erected an electric perimeter fence around the pitch at Stamford Bridge to prevent pitch invasions, but the fence was soon dismantled after the local council refused him permission to turn the electricity on.

Bates spent 21 years at Chelsea, during which time he attracted the headlines on many occasions and employed no fewer than nine managers. His match-day programme notes, in which he often attacked various individuals, were also controversial. In 2002, he was sued for libel by Chelsea supporter David Johnstone after describing fans' group, the Chelsea Independent Supporters Association, as parasites; Bates settled out of court without accepting liability.

During the 1990s, he was involved in a bitter dispute with Chelsea benefactor and vice-chairman, Matthew Harding, over the club's direction, which led to Harding's being banned from the Chelsea boardroom. The dispute was ultimately ended by Harding's death in a helicopter crash in October 1996. Bates sparked further controversy the following year when he said of Harding, "I don't believe evil should triumph and he was an evil man ... This is a much happier ship at Chelsea now he's no longer around".

By the end of his chairmanship, Stamford Bridge had been substantially refurbished and modernised, while he had become (at the time) Chelsea's most successful chairman. The club had won several major trophies and were consistently finishing in the top six of the Premier League, even finishing third and just four points behind champions Manchester United in 1999, as well as qualifying for the UEFA Champions League with a top-class playing squad containing Gianfranco Zola, Roberto Di Matteo, Graeme Le Saux, Marcel Desailly and Jimmy Floyd Hasselbaink. However, its future was threatened by an estimated debt burden of £80 million, yet it was secured against the club's ground, Stamford Bridge. In 2003, he sold the club to Russian oil billionaire Roman Abramovich for a sum of £140 million, making a £17 million profit. Bruce Buck, the chairman from 2004 until 2022, was in charge of the club's sale to Roman Abramovich. After the takeover, Bates was investigated by the Financial Services Authority (FSA) for allegedly owning undeclared shares in Chelsea Village plc, but the case was eventually dropped. He stayed on as club chairman until March 2004, when he announced his resignation. Within a couple of weeks of his departure, he was back in the limelight as he wrote a one-off column in the Bolton Wanderers matchday programme, when their visitors were Chelsea.

==== Partick Thistle ====
In June 1986, Bates purchased a controlling interest in Scottish club Partick Thistle for around £100,000 via a share issue after being made aware of their financial problems by their chairman Miller Reid, who was an acquaintance. Bates installed veteran former Chelsea player Derek Johnstone as manager with the intention of using Partick as a feeder club for Chelsea (Billy Dodds and Colin West were loaned from the Blues to the Jags, with John McNaught also linked to both clubs). In April 1989, a group of local businessmen including new chairman Jim Donald purchased Bates's shareholding in the Glasgow club.

=== FA and Wembley Stadium ===
Bates was an active member of The Football Association (FA) executive and was involved in the early stages of the project to rebuild Wembley Stadium and was appointed chairman of Wembley National Stadium Ltd in 1997. He resigned in 2001, citing a lack of support from the board. Irked at the lack of progress, he later suggested that the best way to move the project forward was to shoot then-Minister for Sport Kate Hoey.

=== Leeds United ===
In January 2005, after failing in a bid to invest in Sheffield Wednesday, Bates became the principal owner and chairman of then struggling Championship team Leeds United, purchasing 50% of the club. He was quoted as saying that he wanted "one last challenge".

Bates had a dispute with former club, Chelsea, having accused them of "tapping-up" three Leeds youth players, accusations denied by Chelsea. Chelsea in turn reported Bates to the FA for his comment that the current Chelsea directors are "a bunch of shysters from Siberia", an alleged antisemitic remark about Abramovich, something denied by Bates. Upon hearing that Chelsea had reported him, Bates said, "I haven't laughed so much since Ma caught her tits in the mangle." The FA also agreed with Bates stating that he had no case to answer. His own club Leeds have themselves come under scrutiny after non-league team Farsley Celtic accused Leeds of improperly signing youngsters from them. The case brought against Chelsea was eventually dropped after the two clubs agreed to a settlement privately.

Bates planned to eventually re-purchase Leeds's home stadium, Elland Road, and the Thorp Arch training ground. However, he failed to achieve either of these objectives during the eight-year period of his ownership of the club (January 2005 to December 2012).

In May 2007, Leeds went into administration (with unpaid debts of some £35 million, having been reduced from £100 million four seasons prior) and suffered relegation to the third tier of English football. Soon after, it was announced that KPMG, acting as the administrator, had agreed to sell the club to a newly formed company called Leeds United Football Club Limited of which Bates was one of three directors. The consortium led by Bates bought the Club back from the Administrators, via offshore companies, for £1.5 million. Bates became unpopular with groups of fans, and during the summer protests were held at games, demanding that the chairman should resign. In May 2011, in anticipation of promotion to the English Premier League (not subsequently realised) Bates confirmed, according to the BBC, that he had become the sole owner of Leeds United.

During Bates's time as chairman at Leeds United he worked with five managers (not including numerous caretaker managers in between managers leaving). Kevin Blackwell was the manager when Bates joined Leeds and was sacked after playoff final failure and a disappointing league position during the following season. Dennis Wise was then hired to replace Kevin Blackwell, but after being the man in charge of Leeds being relegated to League One (for the first time in their entire history), Wise decided to join Newcastle United in a non-managerial role despite Leeds's good start to the season (despite a fifteen-point deduction).

Gary McAllister was the man appointed to replace Wise, McAllister was able to guide Leeds to the League One playoff final (despite the 15-point deduction) but a 1–0 loss to Doncaster Rovers saw Leeds banished to League One for yet another year. In the 2008–09 season, Leeds were one of the pre-season favourites to promotion and after a good start their form faltered dramatically, and after a run of five-straight defeats (including a 1–0 loss to Histon in the FA Cup), Bates decided to sack McAllister. On 23 December, Leeds United hired Simon Grayson as their new manager.

On 1 February 2012, Bates relieved Grayson of his managerial duties, citing a string of defeats, a disappointment in Grayson suggesting that he was under "financial constraints", and need for a new voice and direction. Neil Redfearn was installed as caretaker manager until Neil Warnock was appointed permanent manager on 18 February 2012.

On 21 November 2012, Bates finalised a deal to sell Leeds to Middle East-based private equity group GFH Capital, with them gaining 100% shareholding in the club. It was announced Bates would remain as chairman until the end of the 2012–13 season and then become the club president. The takeover, a cash deal worth £52 million, was officially completed on 21 December 2012.

On 1 July 2013, Bates officially stepped down as chairman and moved to the position of honorary president. He was replaced in the role of chairman by Salah Nooruddin. His tenure as president was short lived, however; he was sacked on 26 July 2013, apparently due to a dispute over payment for his private jet.

=== Death ===
On 11 July 2026, Bates died in Monaco at the age of 94, surrounded by his wife and family.

Business positions
Preceded by The Viscount Chelsea	Chelsea F.C. chairman 1982–2004	Succeeded by Bruce Buck
Preceded by Gerald Krasner	Leeds United F.C. chairman 2005–2013	Succeeded by Salah Nooruddin
