= John McNaught (footballer, born 1964) =

Scottish footballer

Personal information
- Date of birth: 19 June 1964
- Place of birth: Glasgow, Scotland
- Date of death: 7 June 1997 (aged 32)
- Place of death: Hamilton, Scotland
- Height: 5 ft 11 in (1.80 m)
- Position: Central midfielder

Youth career
- Auchengill Boys Club

Senior career*
Years	Team	Apps	(Gls)
1982–1986	Hamilton Academical	106	(19)
1986–1987	Chelsea	10	(2)
1987–1988	Partick Thistle	10	(3)
1988	Hamilton Academical	7	(2)
Total		133	(26)
- * Club domestic league appearances and goals

John McNaught (19 June 1964 – 7 June 1997) was a Scottish footballer who played as a central midfielder.

Starting as a promising talent at Hamilton Academical, he moved to Chelsea in England but was released after just over a year. He revived his career at Partick Thistle, leading Hamilton to sign him again, before he was forced to retire early due to health problems, which eventually recurred leading to his death at the age of 32.

== Career ==
=== Hamilton Academical ===
Born in Glasgow, McNaught began playing at Auchengill Boys Club in the city's Easterhouse district, where he was spotted by Hamilton Academical, signing for the second-tier club in 1982 (one of the last players bought in by manager Davie McParland). His combative and energetic performances drew the attention of bigger clubs, particularly during the 1985–86 Scottish First Division season which eventually culminated in Accies, led by John Lambie, winning the title and gaining promotion to the top flight for the first time in 20 years. By then, McNaught had moved on, signing for Chelsea of England's top division in May 1986 for a fee of £80,000.

=== Chelsea ===
Having been optimistically compared to Liverpool's Danish midfielder Jan Molby by Chelsea manager John Hollins, he made his debut for the Blues at the age of 21, coming off the bench on the final matchday of the 1985–86 First Division campaign, where a makeshift side lost 5–1 at home to Watford. He started the following season in contention for a first team place, and made eight starts in the League and three in the League Cup between September 1986 and February 1987, setting up Kerry Dixon for the only goal in a 1–0 away victory over Manchester United and scoring twice past future England goalkpper David Seaman in a win over Queens Park Rangers on New Year's Day. However, he then fell out of favour as Chelsea struggled to keep their place in the division and spent the rest of season with the reserves, where his disciplinary record was poor.

His final competitive appearance for the club was at the outset of 1987–88, again at Old Trafford, where he is credited in some sources as the Chelsea goalscorer in a 3–1 reverse, though the statistic is mostly recorded as an own goal by the Red Devils' goalkeeper Gary Walsh. By October 1987, with no prospect of further appearances (which would have triggered an additional payment to Hamilton) he had walked out on the club and returned to Scotland. Despite being at Chelsea for little over a year, his spell coincided with those of a large number of other Scottish players at the club: Joe McLaughlin, Les Fridge, Billy Dodds, Kevin McAllister, John Millar, Eddie Cunnington, Gordon Durie, David Speedie, Steve Clarke, Doug Rougvie and Pat Nevin.

=== Partick Thistle and return to Hamilton ===
After a period out of the game working as a doorman, in December 1987 McNaught signed for Partick Thistle, at that time also controlled by the Chelsea owner Ken Bates who agreed to cancel the player's contract with the London club. McNaught soon rediscovered his previous form while at Partick and in March 1988 his former manager John Lambie and club Hamilton Academical, again chasing promotion, paid a then-club record £50,000 to bring him back to Douglas Park, with Partick Thistle receiving only £12,500 (albeit they had acquired him for free).

Hamilton did win the 1987–88 Scottish First Division, with McNaught contributing five appearances and a goal. He played twice in the Scottish Premier Division at the start of the next season (scoring in what proved to be his final appearance in a 3–2 defeat to Heart of Midlothian) but was then forced to retire from playing due to a blood disorder which caused kidney problems, aged only 24. He continued to be associated with Hamilton Academical, coaching their supporters' team.

== Death and legacy ==
In the early 1990s McNaught underwent a kidney transplant; however, having appeared to have been in good health he died in June 1997 at the age of 32. His funeral was attended by various figures connected to Partick Thistle and Hamilton Academical. He is buried at Bent Cemetery in Hamilton.

McNaught was nicknamed 'Worzel' in reference to a perceived resemblance to a popular children's character of the era (a scarecrow with unkempt fair hair).

In 2004, he was voted by supporters as Hamilton Academical's all-time 'cult hero' ahead of Rikki Ferguson and David Wilson.

== Honours ==
Hamilton Academical

- Scottish First Division: 1985–86
