= Wickams Cay =

Coordinates: 18°24′46″N 64°36′45″W

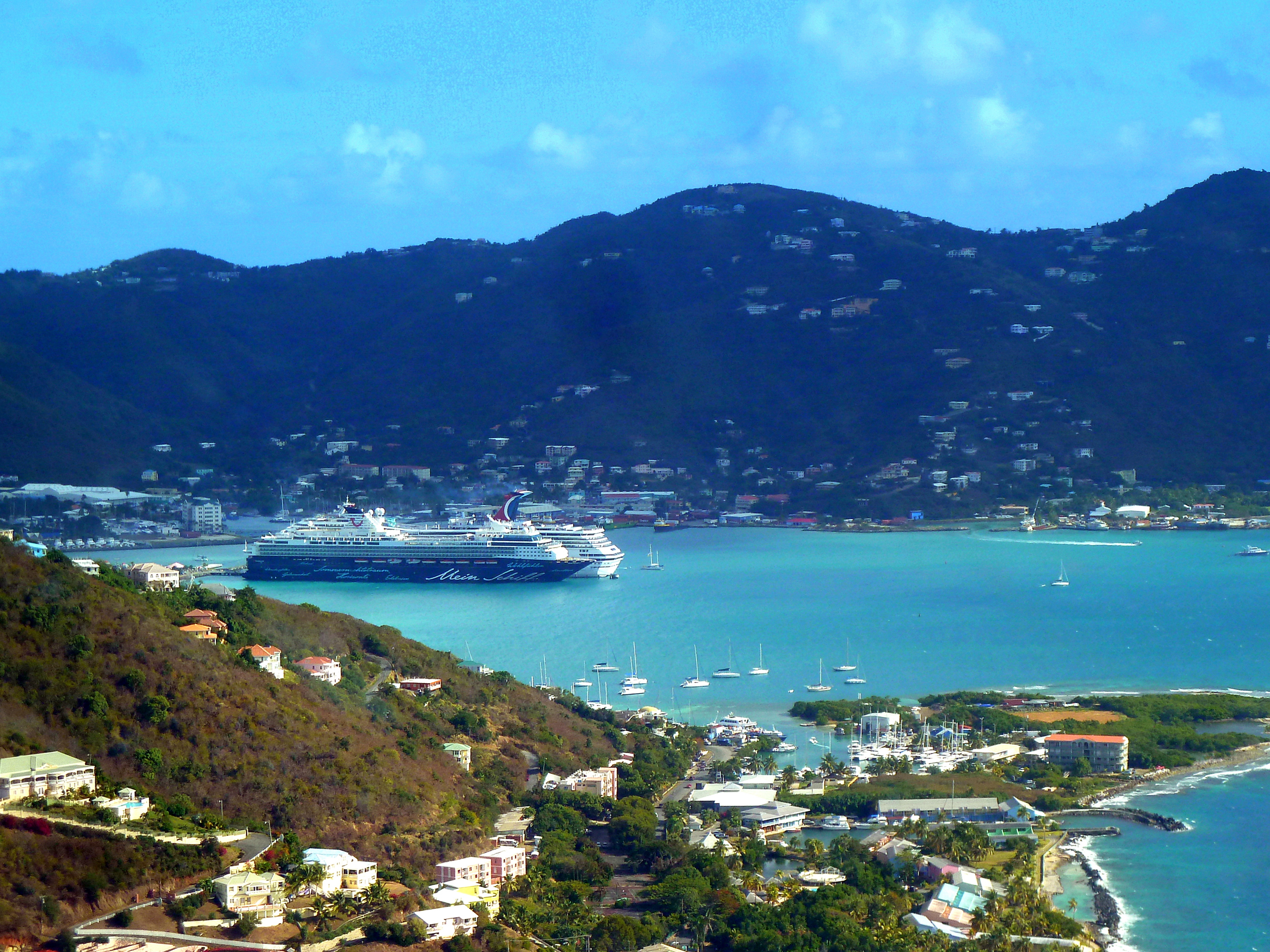
Wickams Cay

Wickams Cay and Little Wickam's Cay (sometimes spelled Wickhams Cay) were former islands of the British Virgin Islands in the Caribbean. They were both located in Road Harbour, but due to reclamation of land projects in Tortola, Wickhams Cay now makes up part of Road Town, the capital of the British Virgin Islands. The areas are known as Wickhams Cay and Wickhams Cay II (for Little Wickhams Cay). Also included in the same reclamation projects were former islands known as Bird Cay and Dead Horse Cay.

The reclamation project which led to the islands being annexed to the mainland by reclamation was highly controversial. British businessman, Ken Bates, signed long-term and generous lease agreements with the British colonial administration. After popular protests led by a local man, Noel Lloyd, those agreements were nullified by the British Government and Bates received approximately US$1.5 million in compensation.
