= Leeds United Football Club Limited =

Leeds United Football Club Limited, founded 4 May 2007, is a limited company, the directors of which are Ken Bates, Shaun Harvey and Mark Taylor. The company purchased Leeds United A.F.C. via a creditors vote after the club entered administration, but this ownership was challenged by HM Revenue & Customs and the club was subsequently put up for sale by the administrators KPMG.

== Entering administration ==
Leeds United entered voluntary administration on 4 May 2007, thus incurring a 10-point deduction which confirmed the club's relegation to League One. Administration had been predicted for some time, due to crippling debts created during Peter Ridsdale's chairmanship. For his part, Ridsdale denied any of the current situation was his fault, only days after having admitted it was a mistake to allow the then-manager David O'Leary to spend so lavishly on players. Ken Bates, however, blamed Leeds' financial situation firmly on Ridsdale and his board.

== Bates is back ==
KPMG Restructuring were appointed as administrators of Leeds United and, within minutes of entering administration, the club was sold to Leeds United Football Club Limited. Had the club not voluntarily entered administration, they would have been forced into liquidation on 25 June 2007 by Her Majesty's Revenue and Customs, to whom the club owe £6 million.

== Future ownership ==
On 6 May 2007, Don Revie's son Duncan announced that he was in the process of forming a consortium to buy the club saying "I've tried to ignore my feelings for a long time as I know the aggravation needed to put things right. But when things get this bad, I can't ignore it. My feelings run too deep. I am interested in trying to get Leeds back where they belong, which is in the top six of the Premiership. I've held talks with some influential people and the feedback has been good. I will be holding more talks in the next few weeks" adding on 13 May 2007 that he would be calling Bates the following day regarding his bid. Simon Morris also launched a rival bid to Ken Bates' worth £10 million in hope of the creditors and football league approving his bid above Ken's. The bid included eventual plans to build a new 50,000 seater stadium as part of a 'world class leisure venue', as well as providing £25million in funds to stabilise the troubled club. It was revealed that a large amount of Leeds' debt was owed to many ex-players whom left up to three years prior to the club entering administration, £18 million of the £35m was however owed to three companies, and £6 million owed to HMRC Following the announcement that the CVA would be heard and voted upon by the clubs creditors on 1 June 2007, the club's previous chairman Gerald Krasner offered to represent the club's creditors free of charge to stop Bates from re-gaining control of the club, after it was revealed that each creditor would receive 1p for every pound they were owed if Bates' bid was successful. The deal however contained a clause that this would rise substantially if the club attained promotion the Premiership within the next five seasons (before 2012–13). On 21 May 2007, 32 of the 36 players in the Leeds squad agreed to defer their wages until the club had emerged from administration; the remaining four were paid by the administrators. On 23 May 2007, Revie provided proof of funds backing his bid making three bids for the creditors to decide between. Ken Bates stated after this rival bid that his bid will be the only one to save Leeds from annihilation. On the day before the CVA, KPMG revealed that there were five offers in total on the table for Leeds United including, Bates', Morris' and Revie's, however KPMG stated they expected Bates' offer to be accepted. On 1 June 2007, 75.02% of the creditors voted in favour of Ken Bates' bid, however it was so close a recount was scheduled for the following Monday. The meeting intended to decide the fate of the club was prolonged due to "heated objections" to the sale process and there was some debate on whether one of the four other bids would be better for creditors. Simon Morris revealed on 2 June 2007 that he was improving his offer to 40x that of Bates' in order to try to secure CVA approval in his favour, with creditors receiving 20p in the pound straight away and 20p in the pound over a set period of time. Morris' bid was too late however, with a recount only being due on the following Monday and not another vote. The recount ended in Bates' favour with 75.20% of the vote going his way meaning Bates now had full control of the club. A period of 28 days still hung over the club, to allow any appeal against Bates regaining control to be lodged, and former Leeds director Melvyn Levi has hinted that this could occur. The 28-day period also stopped any player transfers from occurring.

== CVA challenge ==
One day before the 28-day period was due to end, Bates altered his offer to ensure it was not challenged. He altered the clause stating that if Leeds made the premiership in five years then the creditors would receive an extra 30p in the pound, extending this period of time to 10 years, and increased the amount they would receive from 1p in the pound to 8p in the pound straight away. The 28-day period was due to come to a close on 3 July 2007 at 4 pm (BST). With just minutes to spare HM Revenue & Customs challenged the CVA. This left a very uncertain future and possibly liquidation of the club. Bates had previously stated "If there is a legal challenge, it could take two or three months to get to court and be decided. In the meantime, who is going to pay to run the club? So far it's been funded by the 'new Leeds', but if there is a challenge, the 'new Leeds' won't do it because it's a risk. The implications are that the club would close down. It would mean liquidation. Leeds United would cease to exist, and the loss of 500 jobs would be a further drain on government resources." With the intention to challenge the CVA announced by HMRC, Simon Franks announced he was determined to buy Leeds United through his Redbus investment vehicle. He commented "We are absolutely committed to gaining control of Leeds United and to rebuilding the club, We have already told the liquidator that we will cover short term liquidity problems and that will be standing by our bid and will increase it given certain information. Our bid was significantly better than Ken Bates' and we are in a position to move very quickly if we are offered the right commercial terms." Following the challenge by HMRC the club was put up for sale by KPMG, with only offers before 5pm (BST) on Monday 9 July 2007 being accepted. Former Leeds commercial director Adam Pearson also stated he intended to make a bid for Leeds however Ken Bates has stated that he will take legal action if any other bid than his own is successful. After the deadline had passed it was revealed that Simon Franks and Simon Morris had joined forces to bid for the club. After Much deliberation KPMG revealed that once again they had chosen Ken Bates' bid. The league eventually sanctioned the sale to Bates without the club going through a CVA under the "exceptional circumstances rule" but imposed a 15-point deduction due to not following football league rules on clubs entering administration. On 31 August 2007, HMRC decided not to pursue their legal challenge any further therefore accepting Bates' final offer.

== 15-point deduction appeal and legal challenge ==
After an appeal against the 15 point deduction was rejected by both the Football League and the FA, LUFC Limited stated that they would seek legal advice in regards to overturning the penalty imposed. On 23 November Leeds United requested that their 15-point deduction to be adjudicated by the High Court rather than the Football Association after having failed in two requests to the FA to set up an independent commission to review that decision. The Leeds Board Commented "In effect, the same individual confirmed his own earlier decision, There was no independent review." This request was however also rejected by the F.A. Leeds eventually served the Football League with a writ for the points deduction challenge to be heard in the high court however on the final day available to respond to the writ the Football League offered Leeds a closed doors arbitration hearing instead. The panel was made up of Peter Cadman, who had chaired past Premier League disciplinary commissions, Peter Leaver, the former Premier League chief executive, and chaired by Sir Philip Otton a High Court Judge experienced in football legal matters. Leeds accepted this and after the panel heard both sides of the argument between 16 and 21 April 2008 they eventually returned a decision on 1 May. The decision returned denied Leeds any points return. Two of the main reasons given for the rejection by the three man arbitration panel include the impact of a reinstatement of any points on other teams near the top of League One and the delay in bringing the matter to arbitration. The Arbitration Panel released short and extended documents detailing the final decision.

== First 14 months of operation ==
On 27 November 2008, it was revealed that in their first 14 months of operation under the guidance of Leeds United Football Club Limited the club had made a profit of operating profit of £902,000 before the inclusion of player trading from a turnover of £23,249,000. Once player trading had been included this profit rose to £4.5 million. This was in stark contrast to the financial year to June 2006 from the previous club owners Leeds United Association Football Club Limited whom lost £4.5 million and had debts approaching £25 million.

== 2012 – present ==
In December 2012, Dubai-based GFH Capital, acquired 100% ownership of the company. The San Francisco 49ers bought a minority share in the company in 2021.
