= Salah Nooruddin =

Bahraini businessman

- صلاح نورالدين
- Born: 1963 (age 62–63)
- Known for: Former chairman of Leeds United Football Club

Salah Abdulla Nooruddin Nooruddin (Arabic: صلاح عبد الله نور الدين نور الدين; born 1963) is a Bahraini businessman and the former chairman of Leeds United Football Club.

Bahraini-based businessman Salah Nooruddin, CEO of Envest Limited, initially bought a 3.33% stake in LUFC Holding Limited following the takeover of Leeds United by GFH Capital – an Islamic investment bank with headquarters in Bahrain. Nooruddin was initially appointed vice-chairman on 21 May 2013 but following the end of Ken Bates' tenure as chairman Nooruddin became chairman on 1 July 2013. It was later revealed that he had increased his stake in the club to 10%.

In early 2014 GFH Capital sold their majority stake in the club to Italian Businessman Massimo Cellino who then became majority shareholder by 75% this means GFH Capitol would only retain a 5% stake in the club while Nooruddin would retain a 10% stake through his company Envest Ltd while he would also look after the 10% stake in the club owned by the International Investment Bank.

In 2014 Nooruddin was removed as club chairman by new owner Massimo Cellino but would remain on the board of directors until April 2014 when he resigned from the board.
