= Gerald Krasner =

British businessman

Gerald Maurice Krasner FCA, FABCA (born 1949) was a partner in Bartfields, a corporate recovery firm based in the United Kingdom. He is a former chairman of the West Yorkshire football club Leeds United F.C. Krasner, on behalf of Bartfields, was part of a team which worked with the DTI in its investigations. He later worked with Begbies Traynor colleagues on administrations at other English football clubs.

== Leeds United takeover ==
In 2004, Krasner led the consortium of local businessmen which successfully took over the club. Krasner's reign witnessed the relegation of Leeds United from the English Premier League when a 3-3 draw against Charlton Athletic wasn't enough to beat the drop to Division One. Popular choice and Leeds legend Eddie Gray failed to rejuvenate the club after he was called in to a caretaker manager role, replacing the sacked Peter Reid midway through a torrid 2003/2004 season. Gray was largely blameless for the performance of the team, with the entire foundation being sold out from underneath him. The players faced the prospect that their wages might not be paid from one month to the next, as Leeds United seemed on the verge of terminal liquidation.

In the event under Krasner's stewardship Leeds United managed to tread softly until they could be thrashed out for their now clearly unrepayable debts, large amounts of which had to be effectively written off by the club's debts as they had been taken out in the name of the now insolvent LUFC plc. Krasner and his consortium eventually sold the club to former Chelsea supremo Ken Bates, a flamboyant character who had himself recently sold Chelsea FC to billionaire Russian oligarch Roman Abramovich. Chelsea had reportedly been carrying similar levels of debt to Leeds before Abramovich transformed the west London team into a strong force in English football. Bates had been in the market to invest after being ousted from his position at Chelsea by Abramovich.

By this time, Krasner's essential mission, reducing the club's massive debts to acceptable levels, was now accomplished. Like his predecessor Professor McKenzie, his appointment and the consortium he led, were little more than a stop-gap solution. Krasner's personality and background were never that of the traditional "footballing chairman". His consortium lacked the financial muscle for the re-investment needed in the team to prevent it from slipping further down the footballing divisions. Owing to these realities, he and his board were more open to the advances of Bates than the West Yorkshire outfit. Kenneth Bates was unveiled as Leeds United's new owner and chairman in 2005, and he later went on to sell the club to GFH Capital.

It is doubtful that supporters of Leeds United will ever look back on this era with much fondness. These were arguably the darkest days in the entire history of the football club. But from a financial perspective, Gerald Krasner and his consortium were successful in their aim when they launched their takeover, which was to save the club from the very real possibility of extinction. Krasner has since retired from the public spotlight to focus on his previous role at Bartfields.

== AFC Bournemouth administration ==
Krasner was appointed alongside Begbies Traynor to act as administrator of AFC Bournemouth in February 2008 and came within 24 hours of placing the financially troubled club into liquidation on 3 occasions owing to the club's inability to pay players' wages and other costs. On all 3 occasions large sums of money from the Bournemouth chairman Jeff Mostyn at the 11th hour, to continue the administration, saved the club from liquidation when the administration ended in August 2008 with a successful takeover.

The new owners took control and the Football League "Golden Share", which gives a club the right to play in the League, was successfully transferred to the new company. Owing to failure to follow Football League insolvency rules, by failing to agree a CVA with creditors, the football club was hit with a 17-point deduction and was ordered to pay unsecured creditors the amount offered at the time of the rejected CVA (10p in the pound) within 2 years or face being expelled from the Football League.

== Port Vale administration ==
Krasner was appointed alongside two colleagues at Begbies Traynor to act as administrator of Port Vale in March 2012.

== Wigan Athletic administration ==
Krasner was appointed alongside two Begbies Traynor colleagues (Paul Stanley and Dean Watson) to act as administrator of Wigan Athletic in July 2020.

Sporting positions
Preceded by Trevor Birch	Leeds United chairman 2004-2005	Succeeded by Ken Bates
