= Elland Road =

Football stadium in Leeds, West Yorkshire, England

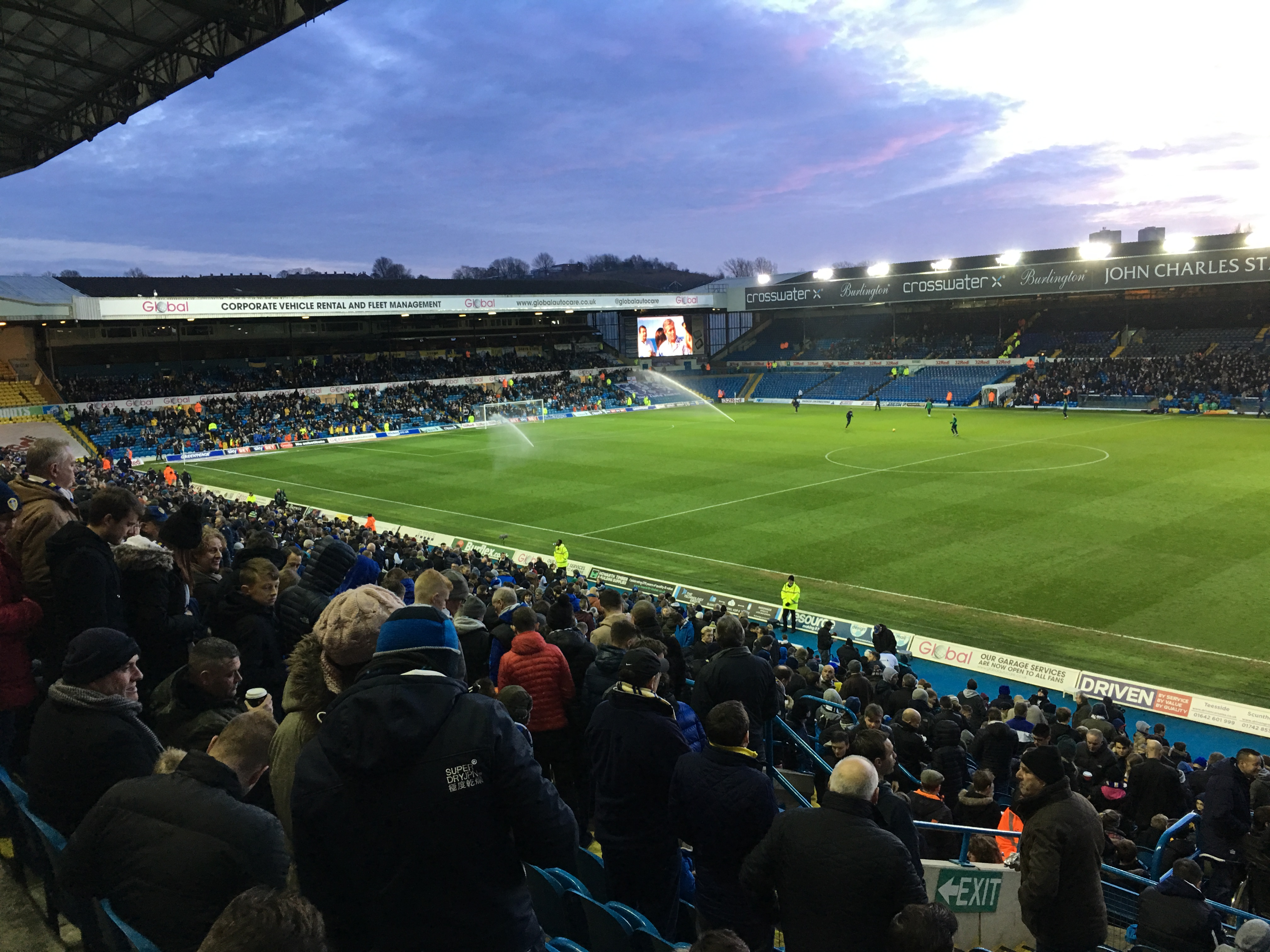
- Elland Road, 2016
- Interactive map of Elland Road
- Full name: Elland Road Stadium
- Former names: Old Peacock Ground
- Address: Elland Road
- Location: Beeston, Leeds; England; LS11 0ES
- Coordinates: 53°46′40″N 1°34′20″W
- Owner: Leeds United Football Club Limited
- Operator: Leeds United
- Capacity: 37,633
- Surface: GrassMaster (Hybrid Grass)
- Scoreboard: Philips VideoTron
- Record attendance: 57,892 (Leeds United vs Sunderland, 15 March 1967)
- Field size: 105 by 68 metres (114.8 yd × 74.4 yd)
- Public transit: Cottingley; Leeds; Leeds Park and Ride

Construction
- Built: 1897
- Opened: 1897
- Renovated: 1920s, 1953, 1971, 1994, 2006, 2011–2012
- Expanded: 1905, 1920s, 1957, 1968, 1970, 1974, 1989, 1991, 1994

Tenants
- Holbeck (1897–1904) Rugby League; Leeds City (1904–1919) Football; Yorkshire Amateur (1919) Football; Leeds United (1919–present) Football; Hunslet (1983–1994) Rugby League: Major sporting events hosted; 1981-82 Challenge Cup Final replay 1989-1992 Rugby League World Cup UEFA Euro 1996 2015 Rugby Union World Cup 2021 Rugby League World Cup 2024 Super League Magic Weekend

Elland Road, or Elland Road Stadium, is a football stadium in Beeston, Leeds, West Yorkshire, England, which has been the home of Leeds United since the club's formation in 1919. With a capacity of 37,633, the stadium is the 14th largest football stadium in England.

The ground has hosted FA Cup semi-final matches as a neutral venue, and England international fixtures, and was selected as one of eight Euro 96 venues. Elland Road was used as home ground by rugby league clubs Holbeck (pre-1905) and Hunslet (in the 1980s and 90s) and has hosted numerous rugby league cup finals and semi-finals, internationals and other important matches.

Elland Road has four stands – the Don Revie (North) Stand (also known as the kop), the Jack Charlton (East) Stand (which was once known as the Lowfields Road stand), the Norman Hunter South Stand and the John Charles (West) Stand – and an all-seated capacity of 37,645. Elland Road had recorded its record league attendance on 27 December 1932, where a capacity of 56,796 watched Leeds played Arsenal and then the record attendance of 57,892 was set on 15 March 1967 in an FA Cup fifth round replay against Sunderland. This was before the stadium became an all-seater venue as stipulated by the Taylor Report and the modern record is 40,287 for a Premiership match against Newcastle United on 22 December 2001. Plans are currently afoot to increase the capacity of Elland Road to 55,000, to be achieved by demolishing the West Stand and rebuilding the area.

The stadium has hosted concerts, including performances by bands such as Queen, U2, Happy Mondays and the Kaiser Chiefs.

== History ==
=== Early history ===
The site, at the foot of Beeston Hill beside the A643 road to Elland, was owned by Bentley's Brewery and was called the Old Peacock Ground, after the pub which faced the land, hence the nickname the Peacocks associated with both Leeds City and United. An urban myth claims that the ground was cursed by gypsies whom had been forced off the land to allow for the construction of the stadium. In 1971 after a run of poor form, the Leeds manager Don Revie hired a fortune teller from Blackpool named Gypsy Rose Lee to lift the alleged curse.

The first occupants were Holbeck Rugby Club (rugby league) who moved from Holbeck Recreation Ground after buying the Old Peacock Ground from Bentley's for £1,100. The first competitive football match at the ground was as a neutral venue for the West Yorkshire Cup final on 23 April 1898 between Hunslet and Harrogate, with Hunslet winning 1–0. Holbeck erected a new stand in readiness for the 1898–99 rugby season. The ground eventually became known simply as Elland Road. For the 1902–03 season the Association football team, Leeds Woodville of the Leeds League, shared the ground with Holbeck RLFC in the 1902–03 season, but Holbeck went under in 1904 after losing a play-off against St. Helens and the ground was put on the market. After a meeting at the Griffin Hotel in Boar Lane in August, a new club, Leeds City, was formed and it was agreed that the Elland Road ground would be rented for the upcoming season. The lease was signed on 13 October 1904, for a rent of £75 per year. The club had an option to buy the ground for £5,000 in March 1905, but in November, the price was reduced to £4,500.

After City's first season in the Football League, the club built a 5,000-seater covered stand on the west side at a cost of £1,050. Attendances were rising, culminating in over 22,500 people cramming into the stadium to watch a local derby with Bradford City on 30 December, bringing in £487 of gate receipts. An expansion programme continued, and the club's directors ensured that the initial success was built upon, employing a "ground committee" to oversee developments. In February 1906, 3,961 square yards of land on the Churwell and Gelderd Road side of the ground was bought from the Monk's Bridge Iron Company at a cost of £420. The committee built a 4,000-seater grandstand which the Lord Mayor, Joseph Hepworth, unveiled before a match against Chelsea on 17 November. The project cost £3,000 and over half a mile of steel was used. There was a training track for the players that ran the length of the stand, dressing and official's rooms and a motor garage. Drainage work was carried out on the pitch to prevent it from becoming waterlogged.

City experienced financial hardships jeopardising the club's future but after much uncertainty, an offer of £1,000 and an annual rental of £250 was accepted for the ground. The ground was used during the Great War as a venue for drill and shooting practice until the 1919–20 season commenced. City started that season brightly, but scandal arose involving illegal payments to players during the war years and the club was expelled from the Football League after only eight games. This led some local businessmen to contemplate digging up the clay deposits under the pitch and turning Elland Road into a brickyard. Yorkshire Amateurs became the tenants, and that club played there for a brief spell saving the ground from development.

In 1920, Yorkshire Amateurs sold Elland Road to the newly formed Leeds United for £250.

=== 1920–1974 ===
In the 1920s, the South Stand terrace was covered with a wooden barrel-shaped roof and came to be known as the Scratching Shed. Another stand was built on the east side terracing called the Lowfields. Behind the goal at the north end was a terrace known as the Spion Kop, or simply Kop, from a hill in South Africa on which 322 British soldiers died in the Battle of Spion Kop, in January 1900, in the Boer War.

No significant changes were made to Elland Road in the 1930s, and 1940s, although it did see some large attendances. On 27 December 1932, 56,796 spectators attended for the visit of eventual champions Arsenal – a record that would last for almost 35 years. The last game of that season saw Leeds play Middlesbrough at home in front of 9,006 spectators. The stadium was chosen to host the all city of Leeds Rugby Football League Championship Final between Leeds and Hunslet in 1938, when a crowd of 54,112 saw Hunslet win the title. In the Second World War, the ground was requisitioned by the War Office for administrative purposes.

Floodlights were first used on 9 November 1953 for a match against Hibernian when the £7,000 lights, claimed to be the most expensive in the country at the time, were switched on. The game attracted 31,500 spectators who saw two goals each from John Charles and manager Raich Carter as Leeds beat the Scottish side 4–1. It was the first of several Monday night games against teams from north of the border and in successive weeks, Dundee and Falkirk were the visitors to Elland Road.

Elland Road before the West Stand Fire of 1956.

In the early hours of Tuesday 18 September 1956, a fire gutted the West Stand and scorched large sections of the pitch. The blaze consumed the entire structure, including offices, kit, club records, physiotherapy equipment, dressing rooms, directors' rooms, the press box and the generators for the floodlighting system. The roof of the stand collapsed into the seating area before the fire brigade arrived and the total damage was estimated to be £100,000, but the club's insurance cover was inadequate. The players helped clear rubble and wreckage, but the 2,500-seater stand could not be salvaged. After a board meeting, the directors decided to launch a public appeal to build a new stand with assistance from Leeds City Council. The appeal raised £60,000 and a £180,000 West Stand was opened at the start of the following season.

The new stand had of 4,000 seats mounted behind a paddock, which could hold 6,000 standing spectators. Two years later another fire started after a Central League match against Preston North End affecting the West Stand. Fortunately, Cyril Williamson, the club secretary, and several directors were on hand and the fire was extinguished and no significant damage was caused.

The 1960s saw the arrival of Don Revie as manager and the club were promoted to the First Division. The club finished in the top four places for the next ten seasons and Elland Road hosted its first televised game – a league fixture against Everton on 20 March 1965 – and Leeds were 4–1 winners. Great advances were made on the stadium during Revie's reign and a new attendance record of 57,892 was set on 15 March 1967, in a fifth-round replay of the FA Cup against Sunderland. In April 1968, the Spion Kop terracing was stripped away to make way for a new stand at a cost of £250,000. The roofed structure was built in less than six weeks and became known as the Gelderd End. When completed it left around 60 feet (18 m) of land behind the goal which was turfed, and the pitch moved 30 feet (9.1 m) north.

The old floodlights at Elland Road.

Further improvements in 1970 included the coupling of the West Stand and the Kop with a £200,000 corner stand, the North-West corner. To complement the upgrade, an almost identical stand was built, linking the Lowfields stand and the Kop, which cost £200,000. In 1972, when the Leeds United Sports and Souvenir Shop opened, featuring a programme collection. In 1974, Leeds won the league for the second time and the Scratching Shed was dismantled and replaced by the South Stand at a cost of £500,000. This state of the art development comprised a standing paddock capable of holding 4,000 fans, a row of 16 executive boxes, above which was an all-seater 3,500 capacity stand. Plans to link the South Stand with the Lowfields were curtailed when Leeds ran out of money. In the same year, the floodlights were replaced by the tallest floodlights in Europe, measuring 260 feet (79 m). Initially, three floodlights were erected – two at either side of the Kop and another in the South-West corner – and the other was erected four years later.

=== 1982–2000 ===
The first match televised live was the rugby league Challenge Cup final replay between Hull FC and Widnes played on 19 May 1982. In summer 1982, Leeds sold Elland Road to Leeds City Council for £2.5 million, and the council granted the club a 125-year lease and the homeless Hunslet RLFC also moved in. Ambitious plans to improve the stadium and neighbouring sporting facilities were designed in 1987 by Newcastle upon Tyne architects and promoted by developers Baltic Consortium and W. H. White. The estimated costs were between £50 million and £75 million to re-build the Lowfields with a 7,500 all-seater stand and construct a peripheral 2,000-seater sports stadium adjacent to the stand. Other plans included a shopping centre, ice rink, cricket hall, cinema, nightclub, café, restaurant, waterpark, leisure centre and shops. None of the designs were acted on.

The old Lowfields Road stand.

In September 1991, the South-East corner was opened, joining the South and Lowfields Stands providing a full corner stand for away supporters. This section was used as the "family stand" until membership proved too big for its 1,710 capacity and a new home found in the East Stand. It is prominent because of its yellow seats, which have given its nickname, the "cheese wedge". A banqueting suite at the rear of the west stand, with a conference centre, was opened in April 1992. The biggest renovation project to date began in the summer of 1992, when the Lowfields was demolished and replaced by a new East Stand – a 17,000-seater stand with two tiers and no restricted views. On completion in 1993, at a cost of £5.5 million, it housed 25 executive boxes, 10,000 seats in the bottom tier, part of which formed the members-only family section, and a further 7,000 seats in the upper tier. The East Stand was then the biggest cantilever stand in the world. This coincided with the completion of the South Leeds Stadium, a new home for Hunslet RLFC, who now left Elland Road.

For the 1994–95 season, Elland Road became an all-seater stadium, with nearly 7,000 seats replacing the terracing in the Kop, as directed by the Taylor Report. The new-look Kop was officially opened in October by the club's president, George Lascelles, 7th Earl of Harewood and Elsie Revie, widow of the late Don Revie. The Gelderd End was renamed the Don Revie Stand in honour of the club's former manager.

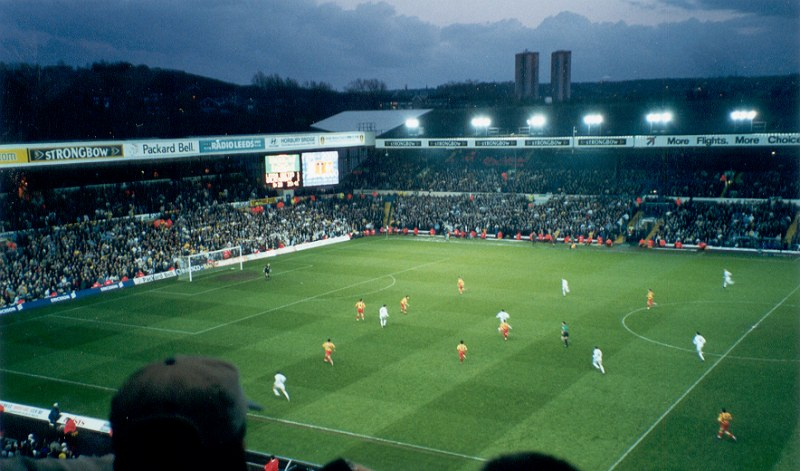
Elland Road hosts the UEFA Cup semi-final against Galatasaray on 20 April 2000.

On 16 November 1997, the third and deciding match of the Super League Test series between Great Britain and Australia was played at Elland Road before a crowd of 39,337.

In December 1997, £11.3 million plans to improve the West and South Stands were unveiled which would have raised capacity to around 45,000. A new structure mirroring the East Stand would have seated around 12,000 people. A three-tier structure would focus on hospitality with a 15,000-seater indoor arena at the rear of the West Stand. This venue would have accommodated basketball, ice hockey, pop concerts and other events. However, after naming an ice hockey team, Leeds Lasers, to play at the arena, the project was shelved. Earlier plans to create a 65,000-seater "Wembley of the North" at Elland Road also failed to materialise.

Leeds received the ownership of Elland Road once again in 1998, when the new owners, Leeds Sporting Company agreed to pay £10 million to buy back the stadium from Leeds City Council.

=== 2001–2010 ===
On 16 August 2001, chairman Peter Ridsdale sent a letter to season ticket holders and shareholders regarding the future of the club outlining two options, to improve Elland Road or to relocate. A ballot form was included but the letter was biased in favour of relocation. Less than 13% voted to stay at Elland Road and 87.6% of the 18,500 who voted were in favour of the move. On 7 September 2001, Ridsdale announced his intention to move the club to a 50,000-seat stadium at Skelton in time for the 2004–05 season. The plans never came to fruition as Ridsdale resigned in March 2003, leaving financial disarray and the PLC was soon to follow in March 2004.

Later that year, Elland Road was sold with a 25-year lease and buy-back clause to raise funds to pay an instalment of a loan to Jack Petchey. It emerged on 27 December 2006 that the stadium had been sold to the British Virgin Islands-based Teak Trading Corporation 15 months before.

In summer 2006, the South Stand was updated and closed for the first few games of the 2006–07 season while work was completed. The refurbishment included boxing in the concrete columns and alcoves; overhaul of the kitchen concourse area, a mezzanine-level office area, modernisation of the corporate facilities above and a restaurant, Billy's Bar, named after former club captain Billy Bremner.

Plans for development at Elland Road to include hotels, a shopping centre and health club were featured in the programme for the match against Huddersfield Town on 8 December 2007. There would be hotels on the site of the shop. Possible adjacent developments could include an arena, casino, police headquarters, cafés, bars and parking for 2,700 cars. On 27 October 2008, the club released plans for redevelopment behind the East Stand containing a 350-room hotel, a covered arcade with shops, bars, and restaurants; extended and improved facilities for business conferences and events, a megastore, office block and nightclub. On 6 November 2008, the city council announced it would not be building the proposed Leeds Arena on council owned land adjacent to the ground.

On 16 December 2009, the host cities and stadia to be used if England won the right to host the 2018 World Cup were revealed. Leeds was chosen and had the bid been successful the John Charles and Don Revie stands would have been rebuilt, increasing capacity to over 50,000. However, England did not host the 2018 tournament.

On 28 December 2009, chairman Ken Bates spoke about future plans to increase the capacity of the South Stand in the future by around 2–3,000. This would be achieved by removing the executive boxes and replacing them with seating. This work never started as Ken Bates sold the club in 2012.

=== 2010–present ===
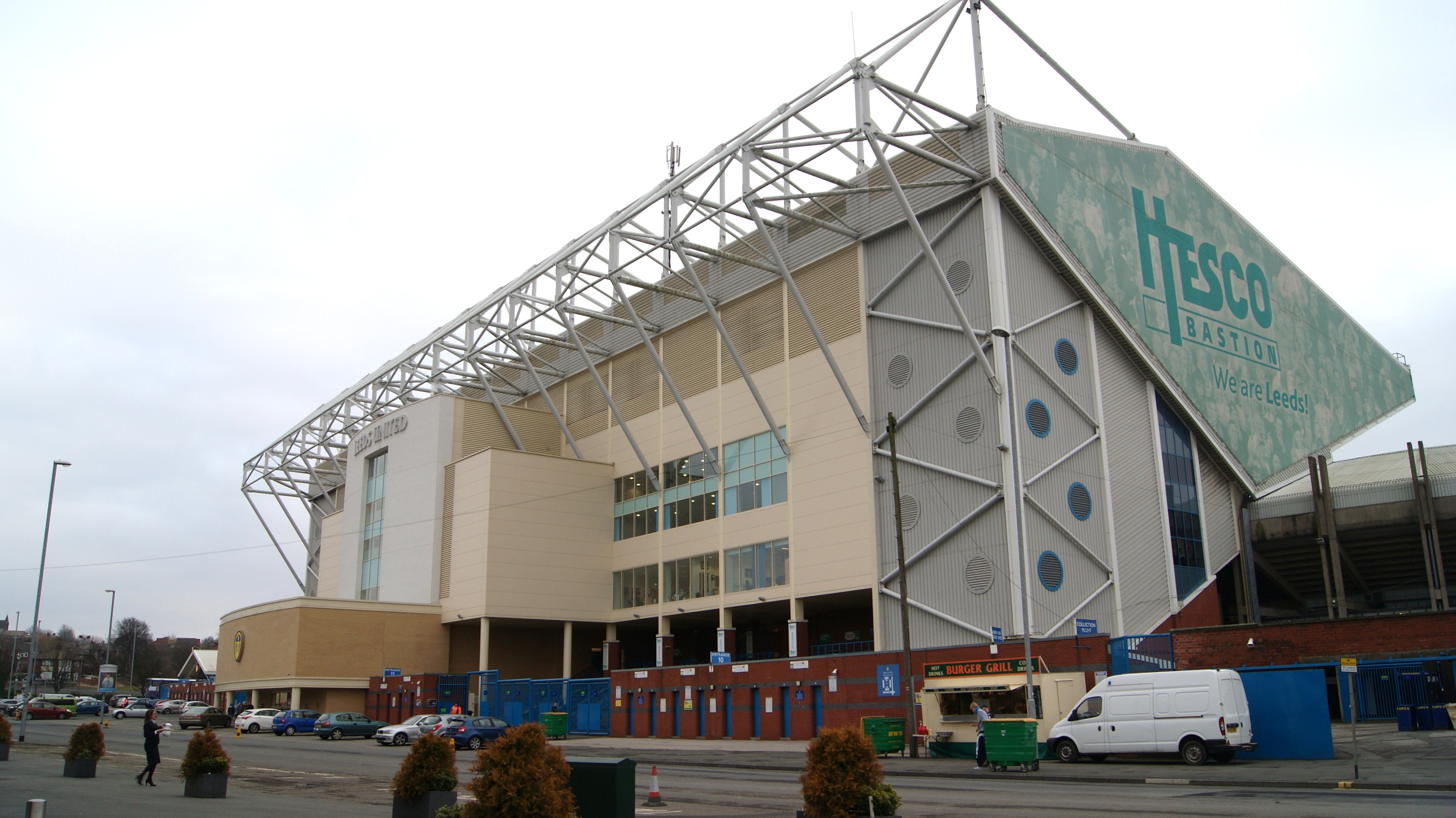
The redeveloped East Stand in 2013

In March 2011, the East Stand Development began phase one of a five-phase redevelopment project which included an extension to the East Stand Upper's main concourse along with the addition of 25 executive boxes and a modern upgrade to the external appearance of the stand; whilst this created extra corporate facilities and more room on the concourse, it in-turn reduced the East Stand Upper's capacity by around 2,500 seats, thus leaving the overall capacity of the ground to stand at just under 38,000 seats. An arcade, hotel and megastore were planned to be built as part of the four further phases, however these plans did not take place following the sale of the club to GFH Capital who then sold the club to Massimo Cellino.

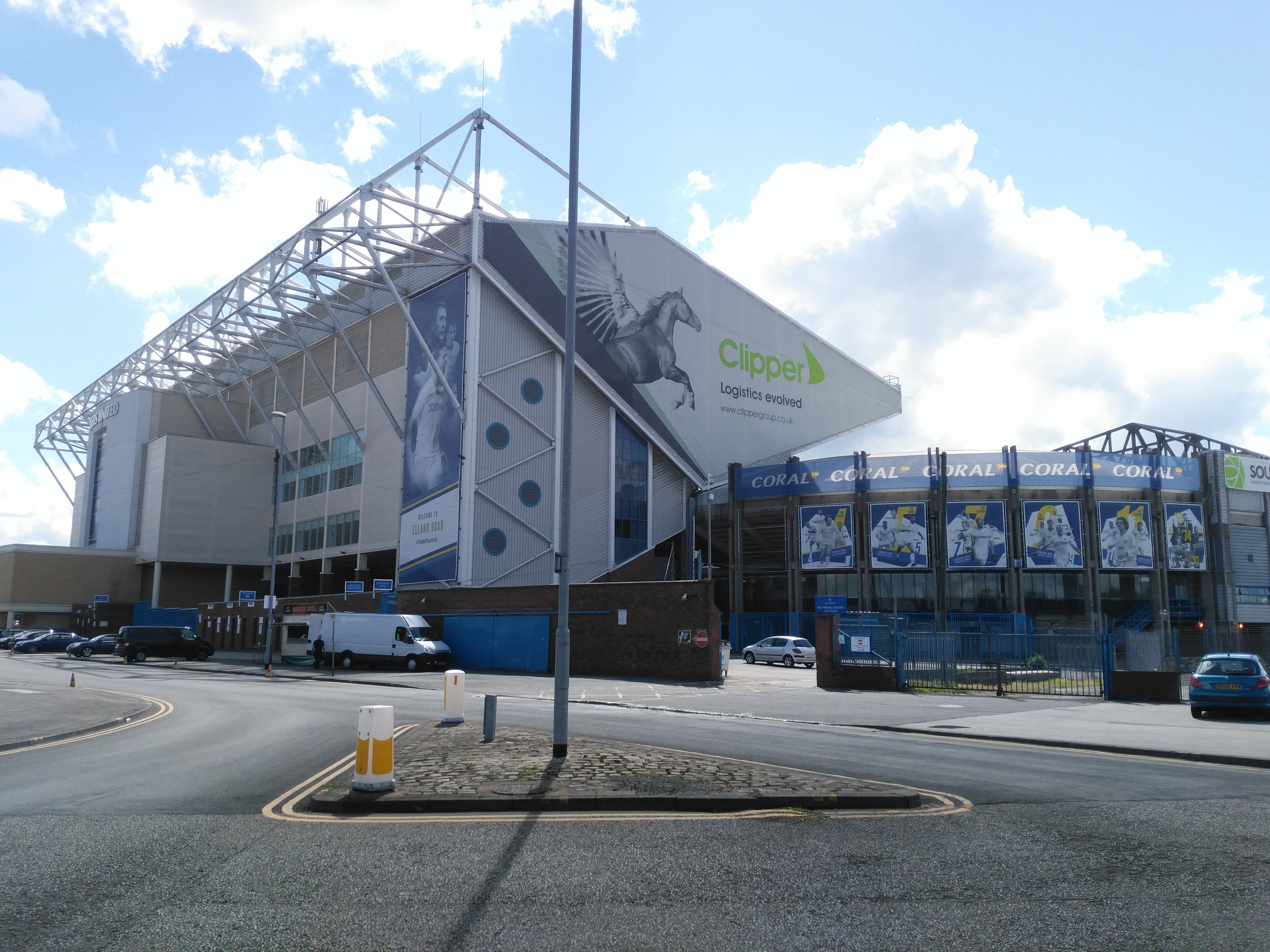
Elland Road East & NE Stands showing new banners in 2017

In June 2017, new Leeds United owner Andrea Radrizzani bought the stadium back from Jacob Adler's company Teak Commercial Limited for £20 million, using his own company Greenfield Investment Pte Ltd. The first game taking back control of the stadium was against Oxford United in a pre-season friendly on Saturday 29 July 2017 in which Leeds United won 2–0.

In July 2017, the club announced a number of internal and external improvements were in the process of being made to Elland Road to improve the general appearance of the stadium. The improvements consisted of a partial new roof and cladding on the West Stand, banners on either side of the East Stand, South Stand and Northeast Corner of the ground featuring Leeds United legends past and present. In addition, the inside of the West Stand, dressing rooms and hospitality suites all underwent cosmetic improvement.

In April 2020, following the death of Leeds legend Norman Hunter, the South Stand of Elland Road was renamed "The Norman Hunter Stand".

In January 2021, the club announced its plans to transform the adjoining 'Centenary Pavilion' into a large vaccination centre to counteract the COVID-19 pandemic, as part of the COVID-19 vaccination programme in the United Kingdom.

In July 2024, Leeds United announced it had again taken full ownership of Elland Road, in March 2024, having sold it in 2004. The stadium is also listed as an asset of community value after an application by the Leeds United Supporters' Trust was approved by Leeds City Council.

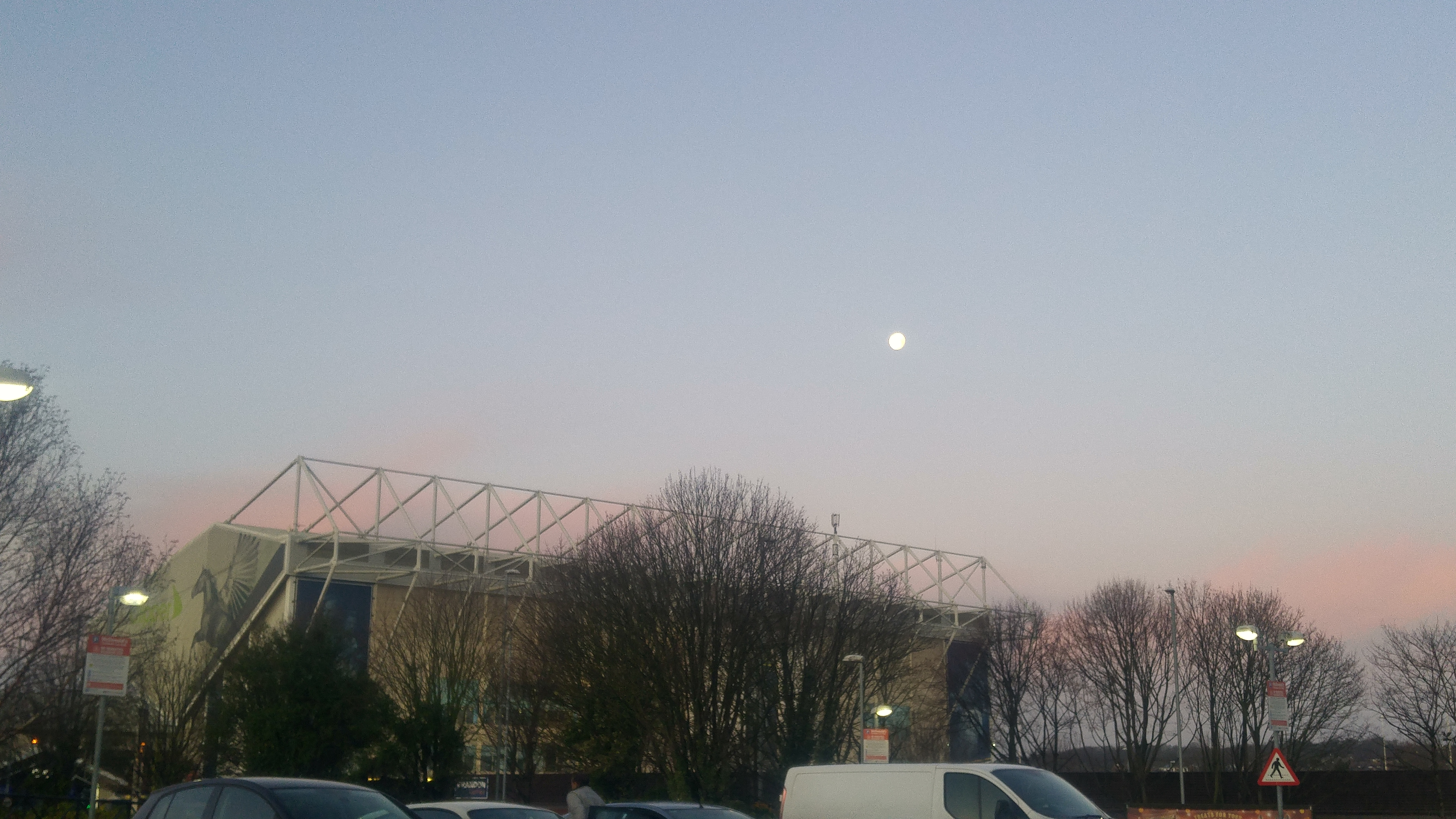
Dawn at Elland Road, 2019

In September 2025, Leeds United announced that BDP Architects had been appointed to deliver an expansion of Elland Road, increasing the stadium’s capacity to approximately 53,000. Planning permission was granted by Leeds City Council in January 2026. The finished product will see the John Charles and Don Revie Stands significantly rebuilt with the addition of an upper deck to both, as well as expanded premium seating in the John Charles Stand. The Norman Hunter Stand will also see targeted renovations and additional road improvements will be made around the ground to ease traffic congestion. In June 2026, the renovations on the West Stand began and are expected to be completed in 2030.

== Layout ==
=== Don Revie North Stand ===
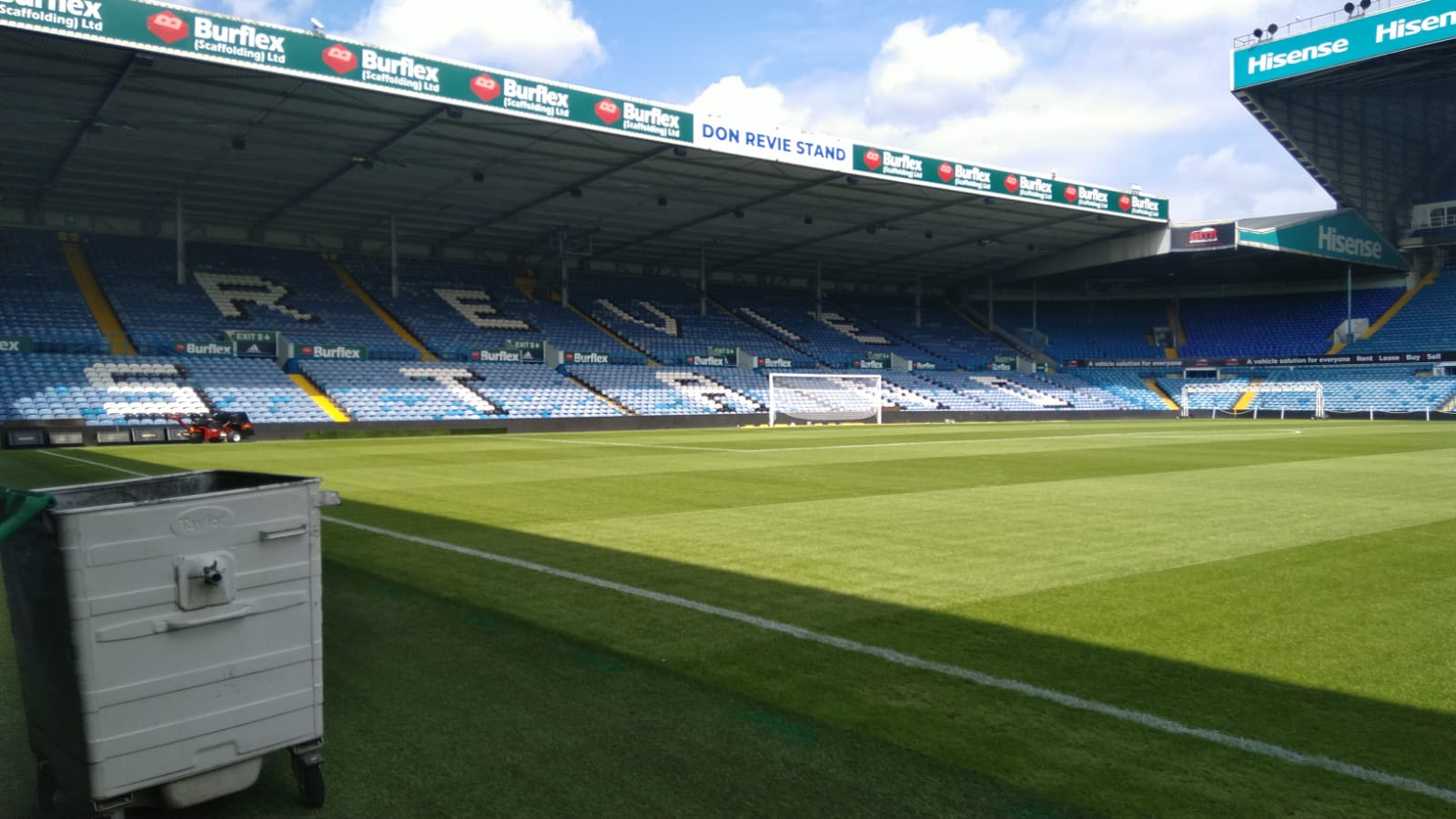
North Stand

Capacity: 7,000 (including north-east and north-west corners)

The Don Revie Stand is at the north end of the ground. It was previously known as the Gelderd End or Kop and was originally a standing terrace, it was renamed in 1994 in honour of the club's most successful manager and former player, Don Revie. The Revie Stand was officially opened in October by the club's president, George Lascelles, 7th Earl of Harewood and Mrs E. Revie, the widow of Don Revie. The design has 7,000 seats as stipulated by the Taylor Report, making Elland Road an all-seater stadium. There is a "ground control box" in the north-west corner which is the most advanced in Europe. Videos and photographs taken of everyone entering the ground are monitored and security operations are synchronised. Images and video footage are obtained by the security cameras located around the ground.

=== Jack Charlton East Stand ===
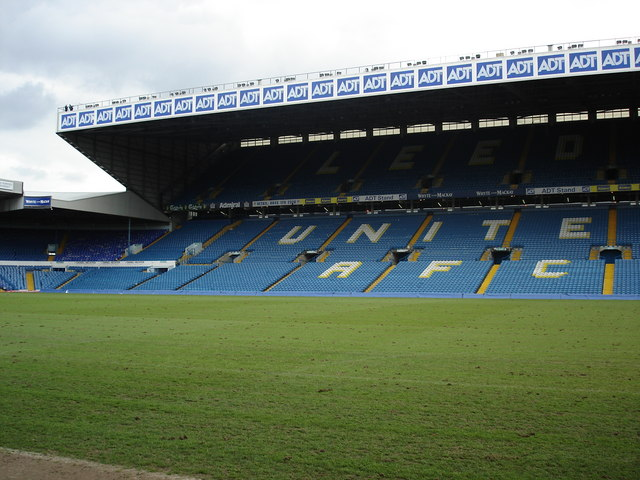
East Stand

Capacity: 14,900

The East Stand is the most recently constructed stand in the stadium. The two-tiered structure was built in the 1992–93 season to replace the Lowfields stand and was opened in the 1993–94 season at a cost of £5.5 million. On completion, it was the largest cantilever stand in the world, holding 10,000 spectators in the lower tier and a further 7,000 in the upper tier. The family area was moved from the South Stand and originally spanned the full lower tier; however, this was altered by Ken Bates and there are now two sections, one at either end of the lower tier for club members and season ticket holders attending matches with children. Sandwiched in between are 25 executive boxes and a large concourse with merchandise outlets, food shops, betting booths and a restaurant. Due to the redevelopment, the capacity of the East Stand was reduced and the words "Leeds United AFC" were taken off the seats.

=== Norman Hunter South Stand ===
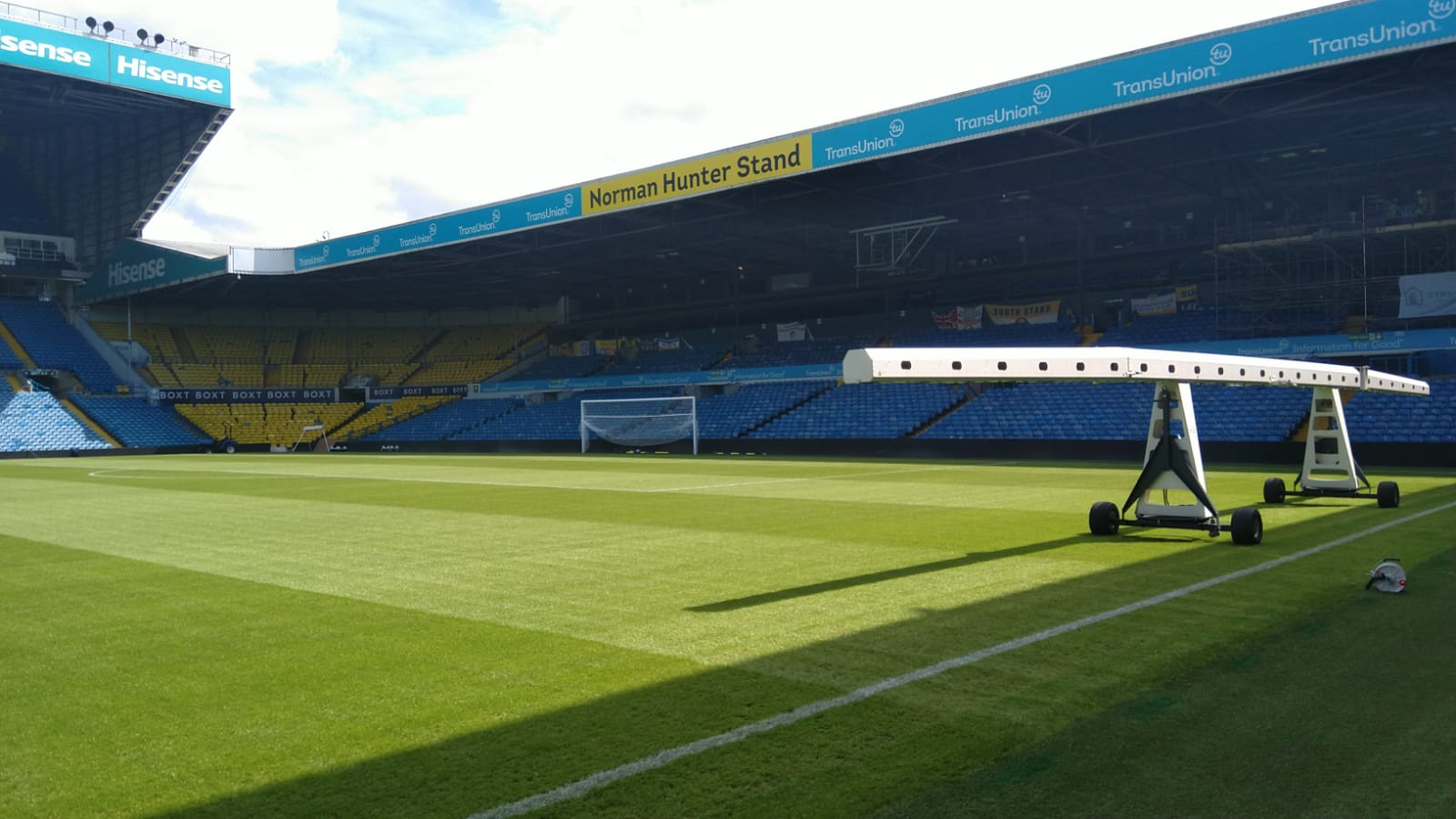
South Stand

Capacity: 5,000 (including South-East and South-West corners)

The South Stand was built in 1974 at a cost of £500,000 to replace the Scratching Shed, which had been there since the 1920s. It comprises two small tiers intersected with a row of 32 executive boxes and an executive restaurant. There are a few seats in the South-West Corner, and a large video screen for the 2009–10 season. The South-East Corner seats 1,710 fans and was used to house the away fans until they were moved to the West Stand. In the summer of 2006, the stand was redeveloped and closed for the first few games of the 2006–07 season. The refurbishment included boxing in the concrete columns and alcoves to give the stand a more modern exterior; an overhaul of the kitchen concourse area; a mezzanine-level office area; a total modernisation of the corporate facilities above and a restaurant called Billy's Bar, named after former captain Billy Bremner. The club's superstore is nearby. On 23 April 2020, the club announced that the stand would be named after Norman Hunter, who had died on 20 April.

=== John Charles West Stand ===
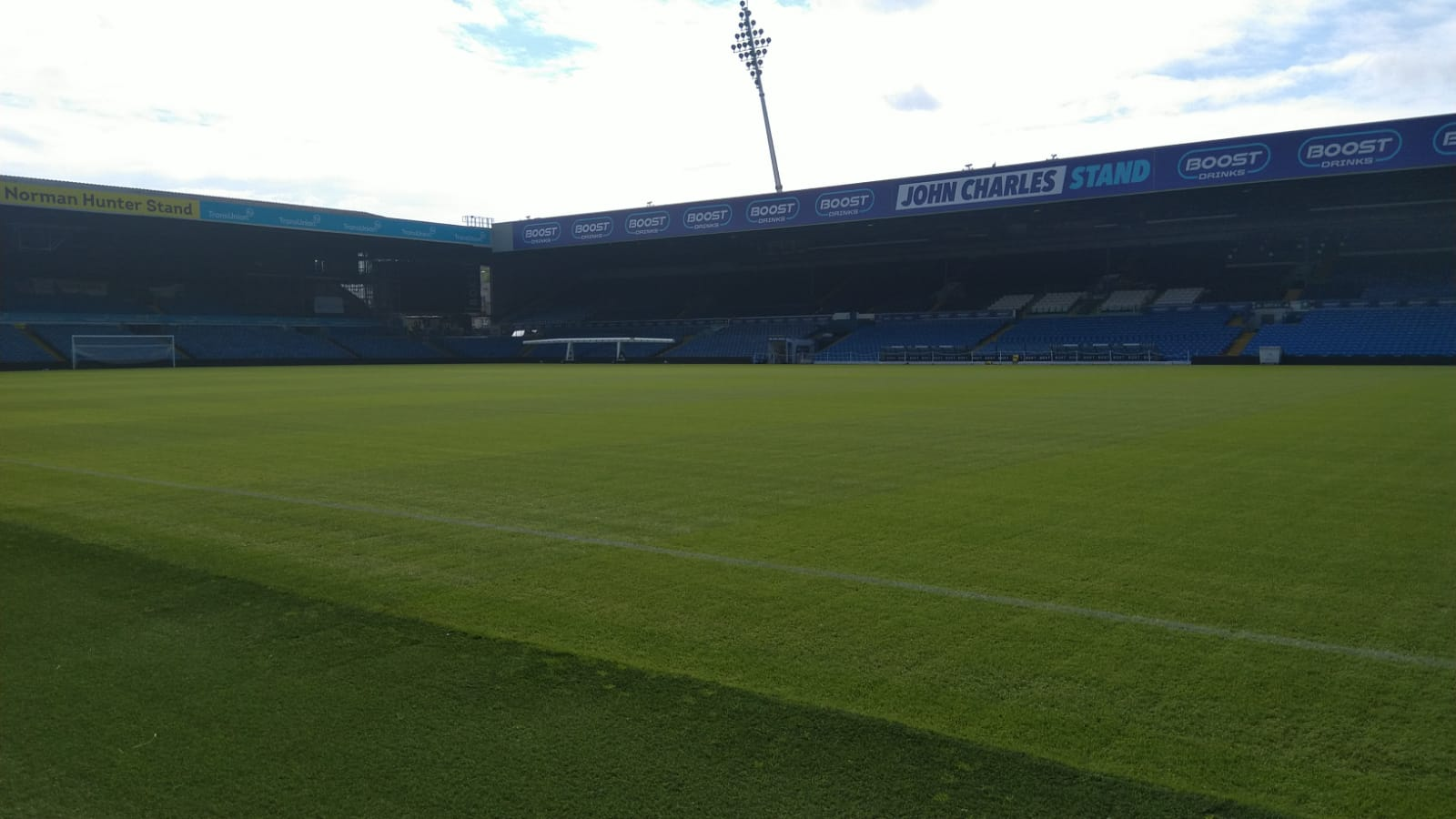
West Stand

Capacity: 11,000

The John Charles Stand is on the west side of the pitch and was known as the West Stand until the fans demanded a tribute to former player John Charles, following his death on 21 February 2004. It is currently the oldest two-tiered stand at Elland Road, having been built in 1957 after the previous stand burnt down, ironically forcing Charles' sale as the club needed the funds to pay for a new stand. The corporate seats are located here and there is a commentary gantry and walkway for TV personnel. The radio and press have facilities in this stand. The West Stand houses the tunnel and the directors' box, where home and away team directors view the match, along with the club doctor. There are many suites incorporated within the stand and a banqueting suite and conference centre are attached to the rear, having been opened in April 1992. As of September 2011, parts of the West Stand became the new home for away fans following a £300,000 refurbishment. Future plans would see the John Charles Stand redeveloped to hold a two-floored, three-tiered 3500 square metre site along with executive boxes as part of the ambitions of turning Elland Road into a stadium further capable of hosting world class matches and events.

=== The pitch ===
The pitch measures approximately 115 yards (105 m) long by 74 yards (68 m) wide, with run-off space on each side. There is an under-soil heating system installed beneath the surface, consisting of 59 miles (95 km) of piping. This, together with a good drainage system, means that only heavy fog, a blizzard or flooding would force the club to cancel a match. There are wells sunk approximately 70 feet (21 m) beneath the West Stand and the North Stand and a pumping system is situated under the South Stand, meaning that the club can draw on its own supply of water, should the need arise. However, the first time the club used it, the pitch turned black as the water was too cold.

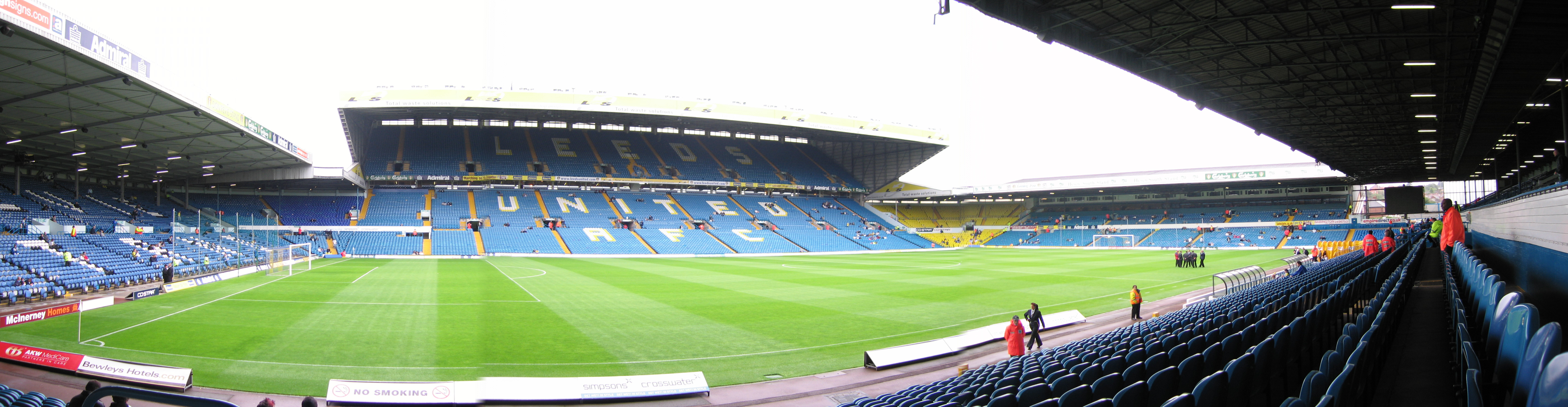
A panorama of Elland Road looking towards the East Stand

== Billy Bremner and Don Revie statues ==
A statue for legendary captain Billy Bremner was erected outside the ground in 1999. A statue for Leeds' most successful manager Don Revie was also built in 2012, celebrating the 40th anniversary of the club winning the FA Cup.

=== Bremner Square XI ===
As part of the renovation towards the Bremner statue to take place in the summer of 2018, the following team was voted by the fans as eleven Legendary players (including Billy Bremner). They were voted to each have a stone engraved around the Billy Bremner statue outside Elland Road. They were described as '10 legend stones' in the area around the famous statue. Each stone will be engraved with the legends keys stats and achievements during their career's with Leeds United.

- (Scotland) Billy Bremner (statue)
- (Wales) John Charles
- (England) Jack Charlton
- (England) Allan Clarke
- (Republic of Ireland) Johnny Giles
- (Scotland) Eddie Gray
- (England) Norman Hunter
- (Scotland) Peter Lorimer
- (South Africa) Lucas Radebe
- (Wales) Gary Speed
- (Scotland) Gordon Strachan

== Future ==
In August 2001, when Leeds were still a leading Premier League side, chairman Peter Ridsdale unveiled plans for the club to relocate to a 50,000-seat stadium in Skelton. The following month, the club's 33,250 season ticket holders were asked to vote on the proposed relocation. 87.6% of them voted in favour of relocation, but the plans were abandoned within two years following the onset of the club's financial crisis and decline in fortunes on the field.

More recently, in October 2019, Leeds United's managing director Angus Kinnear suggested that Elland Road's capacity could be expanded to 55,000 should they be promoted to the Premier League.

On 21 April 2025, Leeds City Council approved the sale of land around the stadium allowing an expansion of nearly 20,000 seats making Elland Road England's seventh-biggest football stadium. The following week, the club released concept images and draft proposals for updates to both the West and North Stands, changes to the South Stand, and improvements to the general admission and hospitality facilities.

On 8 January 2026, the club announced that Leeds City Council had approved the expansion and granted planning permission for the work to begin. It was announced that proving works would begin immediately and construction would begin at the end of the 2025/26 Premier League season.

== Other uses ==
=== Football ===
==== FA Cup semi-finals ====
Elland Road has hosted FA Cup semi-final matches as a neutral venue on nine occasions, the first being a tie between Barnsley and Everton on 26 March 1910 and the last on 9 April 1995 in a game between Everton and Tottenham Hotspur. Other FA Cup semi-finals to have taken place at Elland Road had included Arsenal v. Hull City in 1930, Birmingham City v. Sunderland in 1931, West Bromwich Albion v. Bolton Wanderers in 1935, Charlton Athletic v. Newcastle United in 1947, Newcastle United v. Blackburn Rovers in 1952, Leicester City v. Sheffield United in 1961 and West Ham United v. Everton in 1980. In addition, when Sheffield Wednesday faced Sheffield United in the 1993 FA Cup semi-final the venue was originally planned to be Elland Road; but, was switched to Wembley Stadium following protests from both clubs and their supporters that the stadium was too small to host such a fixture. The risk of crowd trouble were the fixture to be played at Elland Road and due to London clubs Tottenham Hotspur and Arsenal having their semi-final at Wembley, it was perceived the London clubs would receive an unfair advantage for the FA Cup final.

Year	Winners	Score	Runners-up	Attendance
1910	Barnsley	0–0	Everton	
1930	Arsenal	2–2	Hull City	
1931	Birmingham City	2–0	Sunderland	43,570
1935	West Bromwich Albion	1–1	Bolton Wanderers	52,605
1947	Charlton Athletic	4–0	Newcastle United	
1952	Newcastle United	2–1	Blackburn Rovers	
1961	Leicester City	0–0	Sheffield United	52,095
1980	West Ham United	2–1	Everton	40,720
1995	Everton	4–1	Tottenham Hotspur	38,226

==== Football internationals ====
The ground has hosted three England men's international fixtures and three England women's international. On 8 June 1995, England drew 3–3 with Sweden. This was the first England home international played away from Wembley in 22 years, and the first time since 1946 that a new ground had hosted an England international game. The second game was a friendly match against Italy on 27 March 2002 while the new Wembley was being built. In addition, Elland Road would have been a potential host stadium for the football tournament at the 2000 Summer Olympics had Manchester won its bid to host the 2000 Summer Olympics as well as in the failed English bid to host the 2018 FIFA World Cup.

England women defeated the Netherlands 5–1 at Elland Road in their final preparation match before winning UEFA Women's Euro 2022 as the host nation.

When England were picked to host Euro 96, the most recent men's international tournament held in the country, Elland Road was selected as one of the eight venues. It staged three Group B matches, all of them involving Spain. The first two were 1–1 draws with Bulgaria on 9 June 1996 and France on 15 June 1996. The third was a 2–1 win over Romania on 18 June 1996.

Date	Winners	Score	Runners-up	Competition	Attendance
22 May 1983	England	2–0	Scotland	1984 European Competition for Women's Football qualifying	
11 April 1987	England	6–0	Northern Ireland	Friendly (women)	
8 June 1995	England	3–3	Sweden	Friendly (men)	
9 June 1996	Spain	1–1	Bulgaria	Euro 1996	24,006
15 June 1996	Spain	1–1	France	Euro 1996	35,626
18 June 1996	Spain	2–1	Romania	Euro 1996	32,719
27 March 2002	Italy	2–1	England	Friendly (men)	36,635
7 June 2018	England	2–0	Costa Rica	Friendly (men)	36,104
24 June 2022	England	5–1	Netherlands	Friendly (women)	19,365

==== Temporary venue ====
Two of Leeds' West Yorkshire rivals have also used Elland Road as their temporary 'home'. The first club to benefit from the facilities was Huddersfield Town, when a fire struck their ground on 3 April 1950. Leeds offered its services and Huddersfield played the last two games of the 1949–50 season there before returning to Leeds Road the next season, following extensive work to revamp the burnt main stand. Bradford City used Elland Road for three matches after 11 May 1985 when a fire consumed a stand at Valley Parade during a match against Lincoln City. Two months after the Bradford City stadium fire, the 1966 World Cup Final teams from England and West Germany met in a rematch at Elland Road and raised £46,000 for the Fire Disaster Fund, with England winning the game, 6–4.

When non-league team, Farsley Celtic, reached the first round of the FA Cup in 1974, the game was played at Elland Road. Farsley's opposition was Division Three side Tranmere Rovers and a crowd of 10,337 saw the League club win, 2–0. In 1990 Elland Road hosted the replay to the final of the FA Vase which Yeading F.C. won 1–0 against Bridlington Town A.F.C.

Former Manchester United manager Alex Ferguson said that Elland Road was "the most intimidating venue in Europe".

=== Rugby league ===
Originally the home of Holbeck RLFC between 1897 and 1904, Elland Road has hosted rugby league throughout its history (at least 385 matches at present). The 1938 Championship Final between Leeds and Hunslet was hosted at the ground as a neutral venue; as was the 1982 Challenge Cup final replay between Widnes and Hull FC. Ten Challenge Cup semi-finals have been played at the ground, as were Yorkshire Cup finals between 1988 and 1993.

Having previously used the ground for a few fixtures in the weekday evening BBC2 Floodlit Trophy due to their Parkside home not being floodlit, Hunslet rugby league club shared the stadium full time between 1983 and 1995 after leaving Parkside and subsequently playing at the Elland Road Greyhound Stadium (closed 1982).

International Rugby League has often been played at Elland Road, including matches in two World Cups, Ashes Tests and competition finals.

The stadium hosted the Tri-Nations Final in 2004, when a capacity crowd saw Australia beat Great Britain, 44–4, and again in 2005, in a match where 26,534 people watched New Zealand beat Australia 24–0. The 2009 Rugby League Four Nations Final between England and Australia was played there with a 16–46 win for Australia. On 19 November 2011 the 2011 Rugby League Four Nations Final between England and Australia was also played at the stadium resulting in an 8–30 win for Australia.

Leeds Rhinos have played several matches at Elland Road. They played tour matches there against New Zealand in 1908 and 1926. Due to the redevelopment of their traditional home of Headingley Stadium, the Rhinos began the 2018 Super League campaign with two league fixtures at Elland Road. They have also used the ground to host World Club Challenge matches.

The record attendance for a rugby league match at Elland Road of 54,112 was set on 30 April 1938 for the Championship Final between Leeds and Hunslet. The record for a Rugby League international of 39,468 was set on 20 November 1994 for the deciding 3rd Test of the 1994 Ashes series between Great Britain and Australia.

==== Rugby league internationals ====
Elland Road has hosted 16 rugby league internationals. New Zealand's win over Australia in the 2005 Tri-Nations Final was Australia's first series or tournament loss since being defeated 2–0 by France at the end of the 1978 Kangaroo tour. Elland Road played host to a semi-final match in the 2021 Rugby League World Cup.

Date	Winners	Score	Runners-up	Competition	Attendance
19 January 1921	England	35–9	Wales		13,000
30 November 1932	England	14–13	Wales		4,000
11 November 1950	England	14–9	France	1950–51 European Championship	22,000
15 November 1980	Great Britain	10–2	New Zealand	1980 New Zealand Tour	8,210
19 October 1985	New Zealand	24–22	Great Britain	1985 New Zealand Tour	12,591
8 November 1986	Australia	34–4	Great Britain	1986 Kangaroo Tour	30,808
28 October 1989	Great Britain	26–6	New Zealand	1989 New Zealand Tour	13,000
24 November 1990	Australia	14–4	Great Britain	1989–1992 World Cup	32,500
20 November 1994	Australia	23–4	Great Britain	1994 Kangaroo Tour	39,468
16 November 1997	Australia	37–20	Great Britain	1997 Super League Test series	39,337
27 November 2004	Australia	44–4	Great Britain	2004 Tri Nations	39,120
26 November 2005	New Zealand	24–0	Australia	2005 Tri Nations	26,534
14 November 2009	Australia	46–16	England	2009 Four Nations	31,042
19 November 2011	Australia	30–8	England	2011 Four Nations	34,147
11 November 2018	New Zealand	34–0	England	2018 Baskerville Shield	32,186
11 November 2022	Australia	16–14	New Zealand	2021 World Cup	28,113

==== Super League ====
Elland Road hosted two of Leeds Rhinos' home Super League games during the redevelopment of Headingley Stadium. On 21 November 2023, it was announced that Elland Road would be the venue for the 2024 Magic Weekend.

Date	Winners	Score	Runners-up	Competition	Attendance
8 February 2018	Leeds Rhinos	20–11	Hull Kingston Rovers	2018 Super League season	16,149
23 March 2018	Castleford Tigers	25–24	Leeds Rhinos	2018 Super League season	23,246
17 August 2024	Wigan Warriors	20–0	St Helens	2024 Magic Weekend	30,810
17 August 2024	Warrington Wolves	24–6	Leeds Rhinos	2024 Magic Weekend	30,810
17 August 2024	London Broncos	29–4	Hull FC	2024 Magic Weekend	30,810
18 August 2024	Leigh Leopards	26–0	Salford Red Devils	2024 Magic Weekend	22,293
18 August 2024	Hull Kingston Rovers	36–4	Catalans Dragons	2024 Magic Weekend	22,293
18 August 2024	Huddersfield Giants	20–12	Castleford Tigers	2024 Magic Weekend	22,293

==== Challenge Cup ====
The first Challenge Cup match at Elland Road was a home match for Holbeck on 18 March 1899.

Beyond staging home matches for Holbeck and Hunslet, Elland Road has hosted the 1982 Challenge Cup Final replay after the final at Wembley ended in a draw between Widnes and Hull FC. Challenge Cup semi-finals followed in 1983, 1984 and 1985. It hosted both semi-finals in 1986 and a semi-final replay in 1988. Further semi-finals followed in 1993 and 1995.

Having left for South Leeds Stadium in 1995, Hunslet returned for a round 4 fixture against Bradford Bulls in 1997, due to Elland Road's higher capacity.

In 2021, Elland Road was selected to host the 2022 Challenge Cup triple header on the men's semi-finals and women's final.

==== World Club Challenge ====
Elland Road has also hosted four of Leeds Rhinos World Club Challenge matches. The results were as follows;

Date	Winners	Score	Runners-up	Competition	Attendance
4 February 2005	Leeds Rhinos	39–32	Canterbury Bulldogs	2005 World Club Challenge	37,208
29 February 2008	Leeds Rhinos	11–4	Melbourne Storm	2008 World Club Challenge	33,204
1 March 2009	Manly-Warringah Sea Eagles	28–20	Leeds Rhinos	2009 World Club Challenge	32,569
28 February 2010	~~Melbourne Storm~~*	18–10	Leeds Rhinos	2010 World Club Challenge	27,697

* Melbourne Storm stripped of their 2010 WCC title in the wake of their salary cap breach.

=== Other sports ===
Three rugby union matches have been played at Elland Road. The first was between the South Africa national rugby union team and the North of England rugby union team on 10 November 1992 which saw South Africa beat the North of England in front of an audience of 14,000.

Elland Road hosted two matches of the 2015 Rugby Union World Cup.

Date	Winners	Score	Runners-up	Competition	Attendance
10 November 1992	South Africa	12–27	North of England	Test series	14,000
26 September 2015	Italy	23–18	Canada	2015 World Cup	33,120
27 September 2015	Scotland	39–16	United States	2015 World Cup	33,521

American football made a brief appearance at the ground when the Leeds Cougars of the British American Football League switched from their old ground at Bramley to play at Elland Road in May 1986. The following year, they had to relocate because improvements to the stadium were required. The ground hosted a Gaelic football match between Dublin and Mayo, organised by the Yorkshire County Board of the Gaelic Athletic Association, in 1987.

Elland Road was to host a Twenty20 cricket game on 31 July 2009. The game was to be contested between a Leeds United International XI and the Lashings World XI; however, it was cancelled when a suitable artificial pitch could not be found.

On 23 January 2018, it was confirmed that Boxer Josh Warrington would fight IBF world champion Lee Selby (26–1) in his first world title fight on 19 May. On 30 January Elland Road was confirmed as the venue for the fight. Josh Warrington secured a split-decision victory over Selby by thoroughly outworking him for the majority of the twelve rounds to claim the title, and hand Selby his second career loss. The match featured ex-Leeds United legend Lucas Radebe as part of Warrington's ringwalk and band Kaiser Chiefs also played songs at the event.

=== Other sports venues on Elland Road ===
There was a greyhound stadium on Elland Road to the south-west of the football ground which opened on 16 July 1927. It was owned by the Greyhound Racing Association and they eventually sold it to the Totalisators and Greyhound Holdings (T.G.H) who were bought out by Ladbrokes in 1974.

In 1979, the track kennels were closed followed by the track itself on 1 March 1982.

There was also a speedway track known as Fullerton Park, which operated between the two world wars, attracted audiences in the range of 10,000–20,000 people. Fullerton Park also held greyhound racing from 1927 to 1938.

Leeds Knights Ice Hockey team play at a Planet Ice venue to the south-west of the ground adjacent to where Elland Road passes under the Leeds-Wakefield railway line.

=== Film and television ===
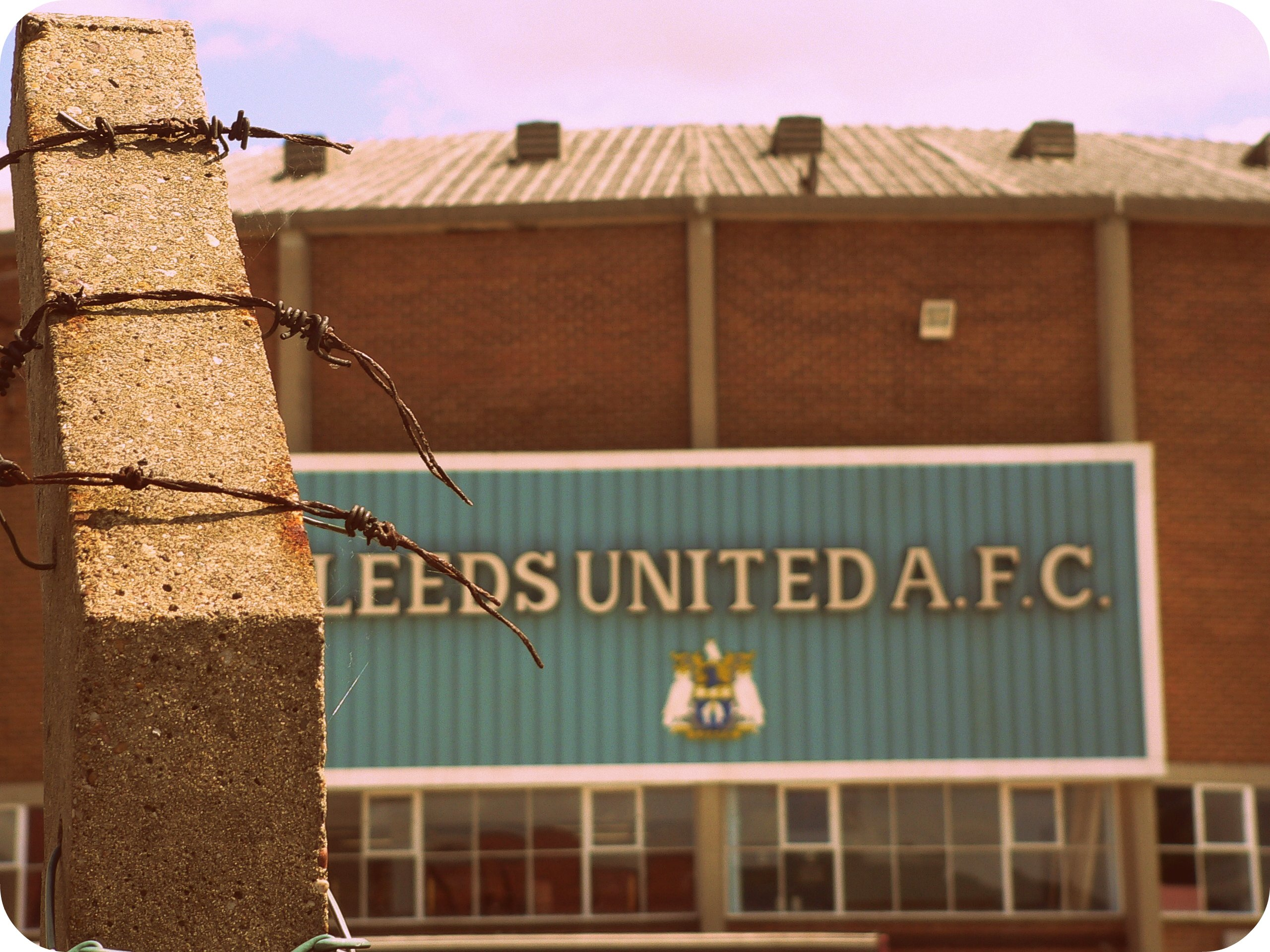
Parts of Elland Road were given a retro look during filming of The Damned United.

Older parts of the stadium were used in the 2009 film The Damned United, which was centred on the 44-day reign of Brian Clough (played by Michael Sheen) at the club in 1974. Some shots of the 1974 Elland Road were shot at other locations to make the film look more in keeping with that era.

Elland Road was used as a substitute for the old Wembley Stadium for scenes in the 2010 film The King's Speech, which was nominated for 12 Oscars, three of which were for its stars Colin Firth, Geoffrey Rush and Helena Bonham Carter.

The ground was also featured in a 1975 episode of BBC sitcom Porridge, "Happy Release", in which prisoners Fletcher and Blanco gain revenge on a fellow prisoner, Norris, by giving him a fake treasure map before his release. The episode ends with Norris being arrested by the police after being found digging up a section of the Elland Road pitch in the middle of the night; the scenes were actually filmed at QPR's Loftus Road ground.

=== Concerts ===
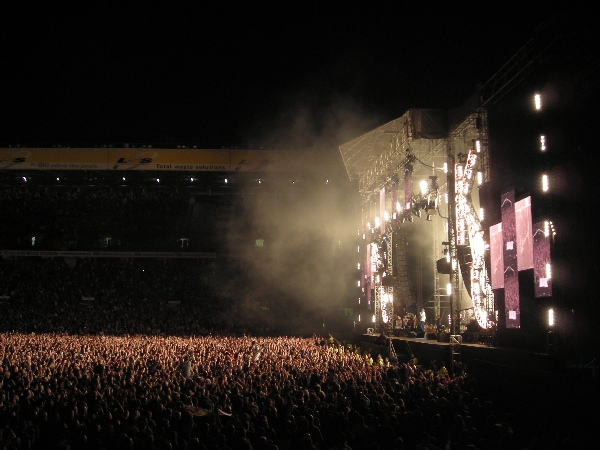
The Kaiser Chiefs' stage in front of the South Stand for their concert on 24 May 2008

Date	Performer(s)	Opening act(s)	Tour/event	Attendance
29 May 1982	Queen	Heart; Joan Jett and the Blackhearts; The Teardrop Explodes	Hot Space Tour	42,000
1 July 1987	U2	World Party; The Fall; The Mission; The Pretenders	Joshua Tree Tour	30,000
1 June 1991	Happy Mondays	The Farm; Stereo MCs; The La's		
24 May 2008	Kaiser Chiefs	Kate Nash; The Enemy; Friendly Fires; Young Knives	Off With Their Heads Tour	35,000
3 June 2011	Rod Stewart	Stevie Nicks	Heart & Soul Tour	
8 June 2019	Kaiser Chiefs	The Vaccines; The Sherlocks; Gaz Coombes; Marsicans; Skinny Living	Leeds United centenary celebrations	16,000

=== Religious events ===
In 1987, 15,000 Jehovah's Witnesses held a three-day convention at Elland Road stadium. Elland Road hosted the annual Jehovah's Witness conventions until 2013, when they moved to the new First Direct Arena.

== Transport ==
The nearest railway station is Cottingley, although fans travelling will be more likely to arrive at Leeds Station, which is approximately 1.5 miles (2.4 km) from the stadium. This is around a 35-minute walk, but taxis and buses run from outside the station to the ground. Visitors travelling by car can park in the ground's nearby car parks near M621 junction 1 or make use of limited space in surrounding streets. On match days, there are special bus services direct to and from the stadium, usually departing from Sovereign Street near Leeds Station, as well as regular local bus services.

Leeds City Council have raised plans for a railway station on the Wakefield Line serving Elland Road but there are no time frames since capacity issues on the Wakefield Line and funding for a new station would need addressing.

== Attendance ==
=== Leeds City ===
In Leeds City's brief history, attendances were among the worst in the league. The club competed in the league for 15 years, from the 1905–06 season until its expulsion in the 1919–20 season. The club was poorly financed throughout that period. Association football was a new concept in the area, which was traditionally a rugby league region. Nonetheless, the club were, until the 2009 relegation of Luton Town, the highest-placed team not currently in the league in the all-time average attendance figures for the Football League and Premier League. In total, 1,944,365 people attended Elland Road for all the matches played by the club, giving an average figure of 10,234.

=== Leeds United ===
Leeds United was formed shortly after City's dissolution and entered the league in the 1920–21 season. By this time, football had established itself and in its first season, the average attendance was over 16,000. As of the 2021–22 season, 51,495,892 have attended all of Leeds United's matches combined, which gives an average of 25,956. This figure is the tenth highest average in England. The table gives a summary of the attendance figures of all Leeds United's league games in every season since the turn of the century.

Season	League	Lowest	Highest	Average
2000–01	Premier League	35,552	40,055	38,974
2001–02	Premier League	38,237	40,287	39,784
2002–03	Premier League	35,537	40,205	39,121
2003–04	Premier League	30,544	40,153	36,666
2004–05	Championship	24,585	34,496	29,207
2005–06	Championship	18,353	27,843	22,354
2006–07	Championship	16,268	31,269	21,613
2007–08	League One	19,095	38,256	26,546
2008–09	League One	18,847	37,036	23,813
2009–10	League One	17,635	38,234	24,817
2010–11	Championship	20,747	33,622	27,299
2011–12	Championship	19,469	33,366	23,283
2012–13	Championship	16,788	25,532	21,572
2013–14	Championship	17,343	33,432	25,089
2014–15	Championship	17,634	31,850	24,278
2015–16	Championship	17,103	29,311	22,448
2016–17	Championship	19,009	36,002	27,699
2017–18	Championship	26,434	35,377	31,521
2018–19	Championship	27,729	37,004	34,033
2019–20 (Note: Final five home games this season played behind closed doors due to impact of COVID-19 pandemic. Not included 0 attendance figures into average attendance calculation.)	Championship	34,006	36,514	35,321
2020–21 (Note: Only the final home game of the season played in front of fans due to the impact of COVID-19 pandemic. Not included 0 attendance figures into average attendance calculation.)	Premier League	8,000	8,000	8,000
2021–22	Premier League	35,558	36,715	36,308
2022–23	Premier League	36,173	36,955	36,502
2023–24	Championship	32,663	36,954	35,984
2024–25	Championship	34,401	36,804	36,432

== In popular media ==
The stadium was licensed in 2020 for the first time in the EA Sports video game FIFA 21.

== Gallery ==
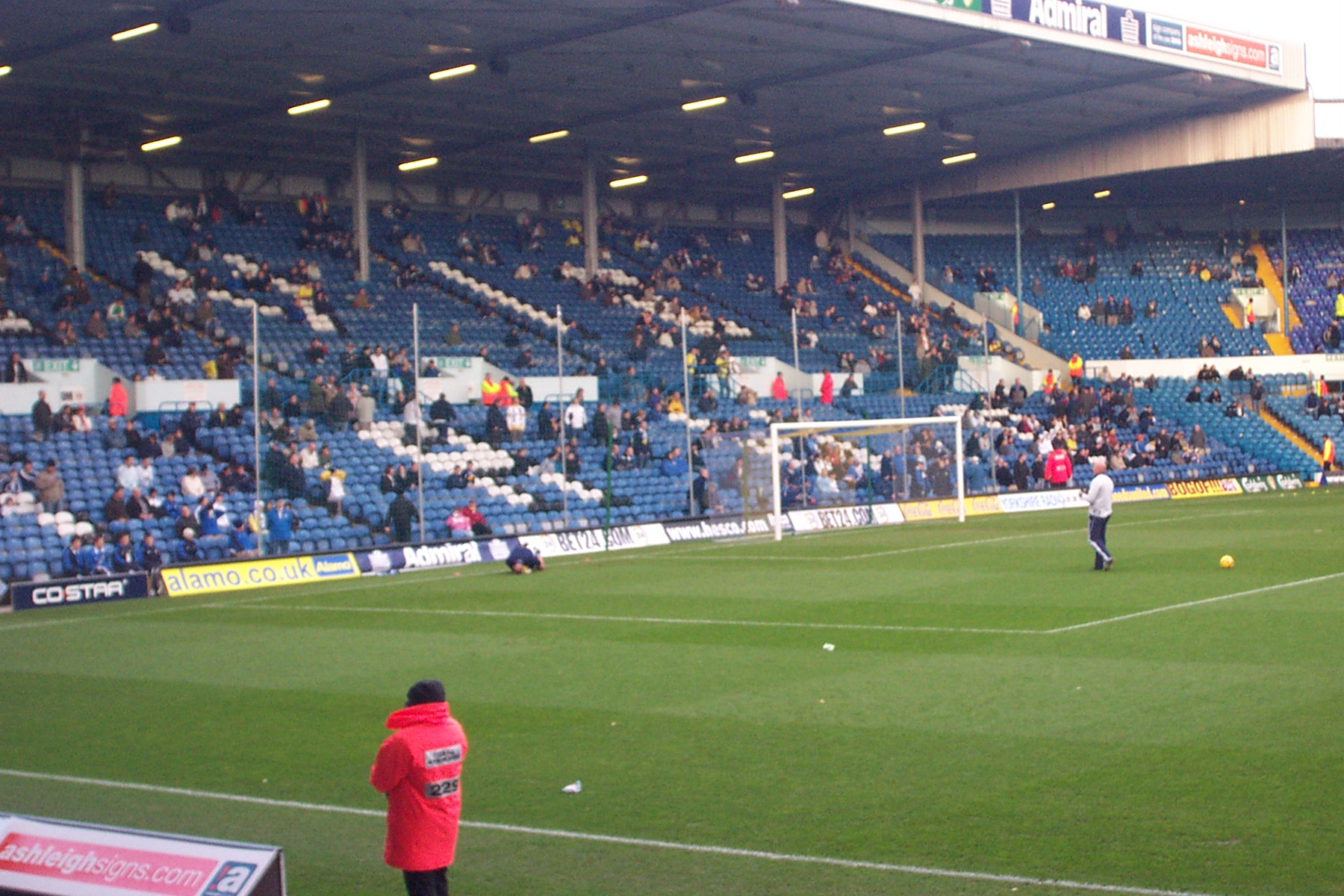
The Revie Stand filling up, taken from the West Stand

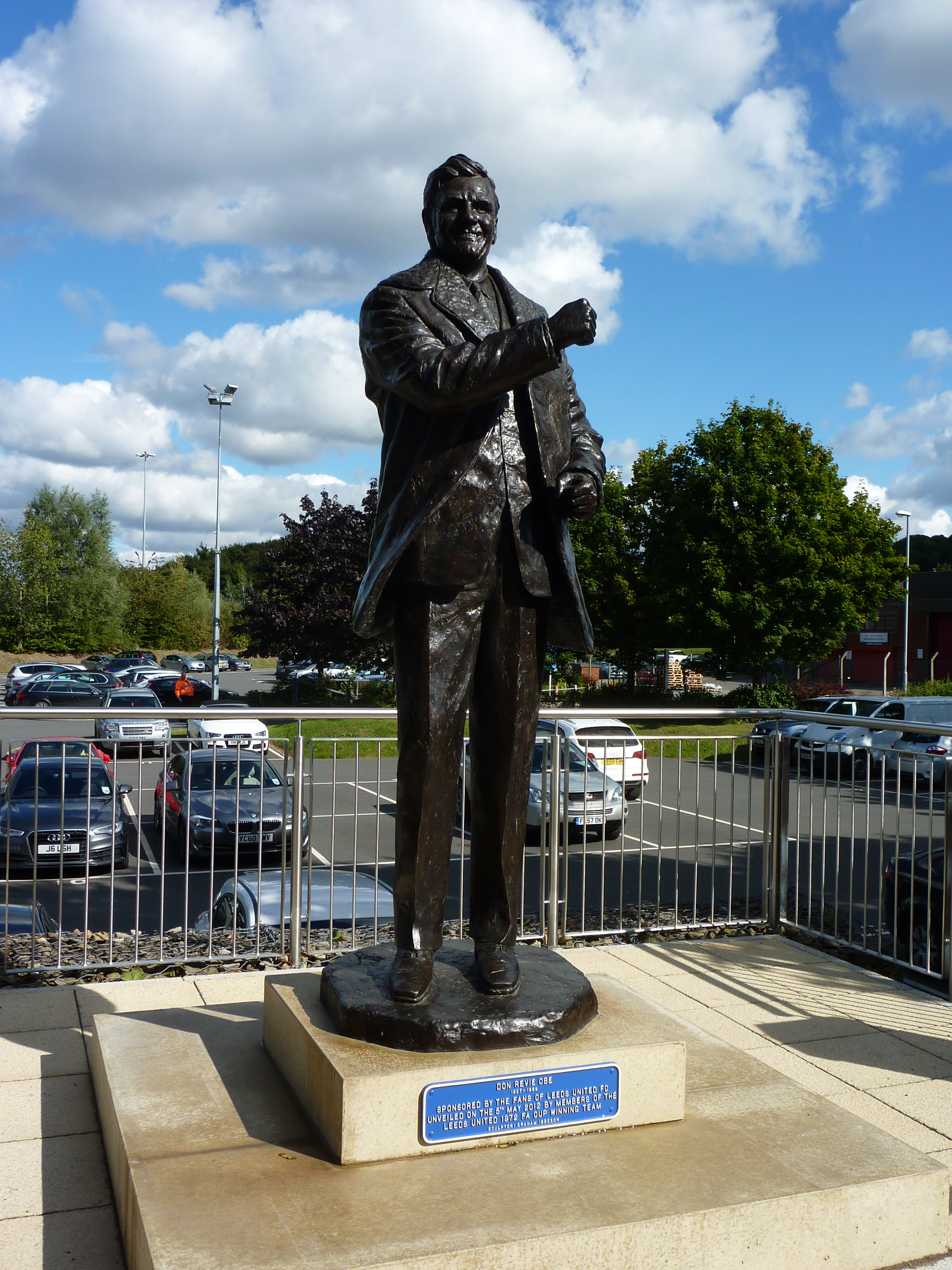
The statue of Don Revie opposite the East Stand

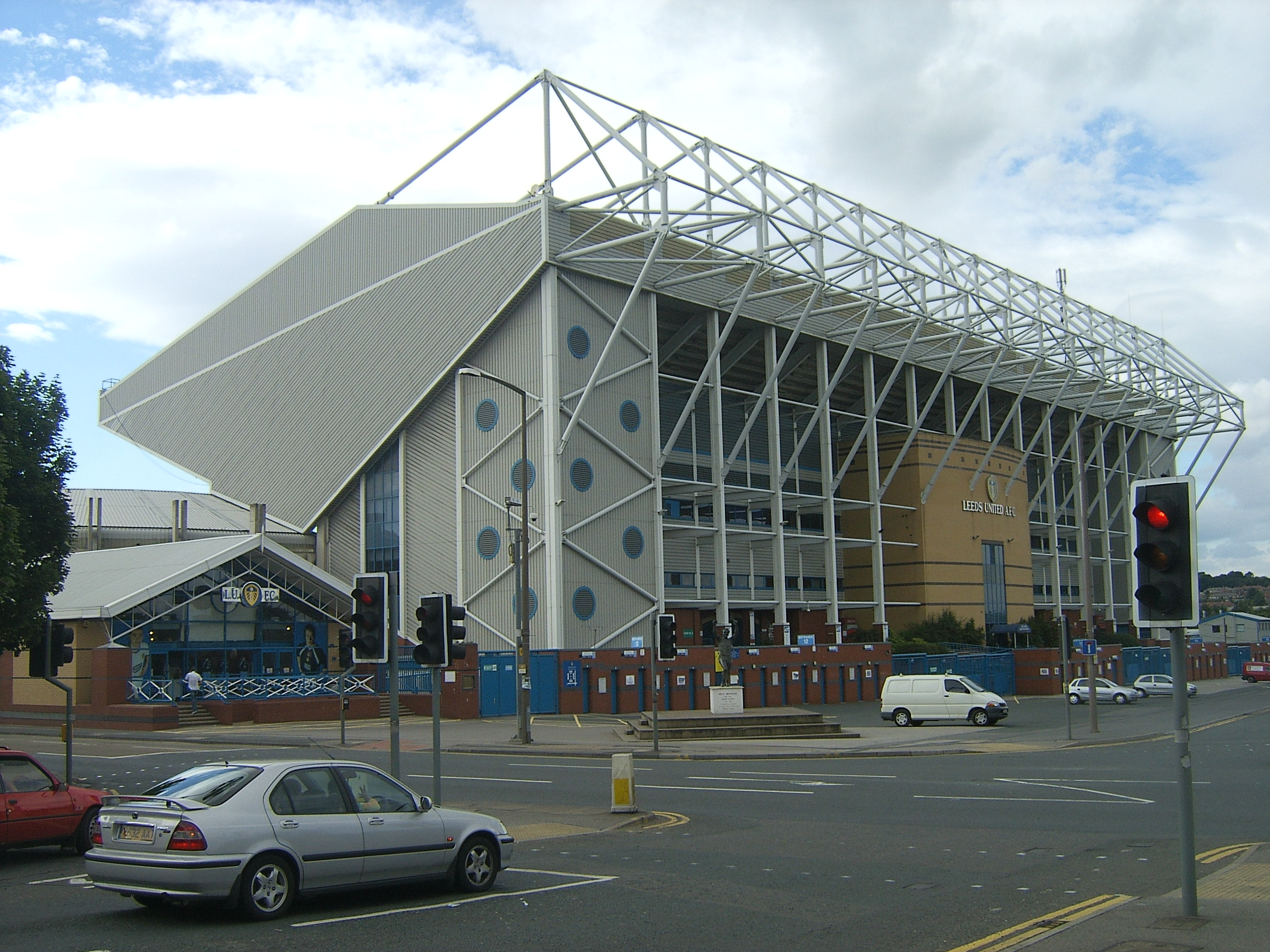
East Stand exterior and club shop prior to its redevelopment

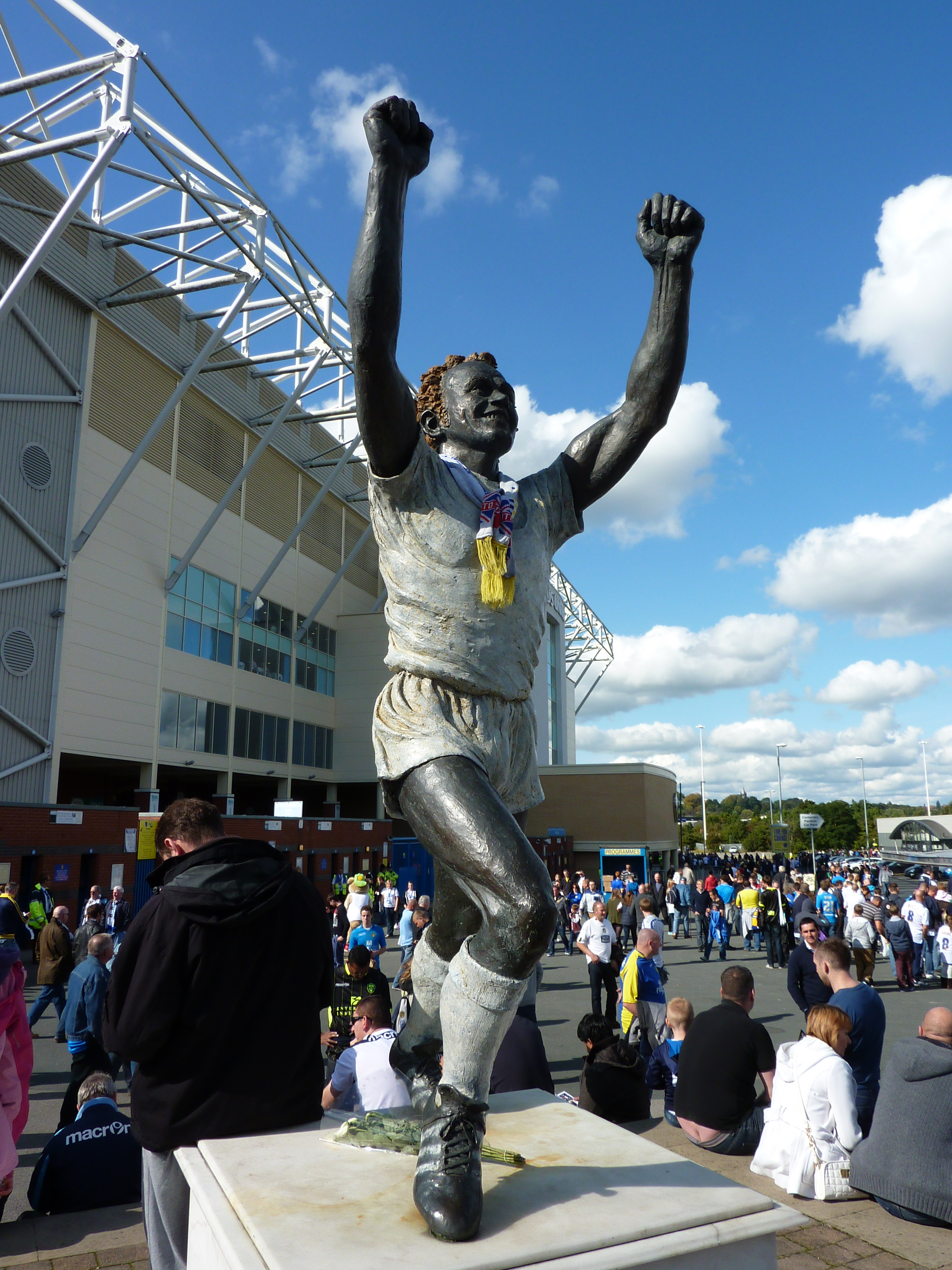
The Billy Bremner statue opposite the club shop at the south-east corner of the ground

== See also ==
- List of stadiums in the United Kingdom by capacity
- Lists of stadiums
