= 2009–10 Leeds United F.C. season =

2009–10 season of Leeds United

Leeds United
2009–10 season
- Chairman: Ken Bates
- Manager: Simon Grayson
- Stadium: Elland Road
- League One: 2nd (promoted)
- FA Cup: Fourth round
- League Cup: Third round
- League Trophy: Area finals
- Top goalscorer: League: Jermaine Beckford (25); All: Jermaine Beckford (31)
- Highest home attendance: 38,234 vs Bristol Rovers (8 May 2010, League One)
- Lowest home attendance: 8,429 vs Darlington (6 October 2009, League Trophy)
- Average home league attendance: 23,115
Home colours	Away colours

The 2009–10 season was Leeds United's third consecutive season in the third tier of English football, which saw them finish second, winning promotion to the Championship.

== Season summary ==
Simon Grayson became the first manager in four years to complete a full season as Leeds boss and celebrated it by winning the club's first promotion in twenty years. For the third season in a row, Jermaine Beckford was the club's top goalscorer with 31 goals in all competitions; Beckford was again named the League One Player of the Year, however lost out on the club's Player of the Year to Patrick Kisnorbo.

== Events ==
This is a list of the significant events to occur at the club during the 2008–09 season, presented in chronological order (starting from 15 May 2009 and ending on the final day of the club's final match in the 2009–10 season). This list does not include transfers or new contracts, which are listed in the transfers section below, or match results, which are in the matches section.

=== May ===
- 15 May: The eight new academy scholars for the 2009–10 season are revealed to be: James Baxendale, Jonathan Birbeck, James Booker, Alex Cairns, Joe McCann, Sanchez Payne, Lewis Turner and Nathan Turner.
- 26 May: The club's top goalscorer in the 2008–09 season, Jermaine Beckford, rejects a three-year contract offer from the club. As a result, the club put the player on the transfer list.

=== June ===
- 17 June: The League One fixtures for the 2009–10 season are released with Leeds' first match against Exeter City at Elland Road. The final game of the season will be against Bristol Rovers at home.

=== July ===
- 2 July: The players return to Thorp Arch for pre-season training.
- 8 July: The club state that they will be investigating the circumstances surrounding academy product Luke Garbutt's move to Everton.
- 9 July: The club announce that they have rejected bids from two Premier League clubs for starlet Fabian Delph. They also reveal that they have rejected unacceptable bids for Jermaine Beckford.
- 17 July: Jermaine Beckford is taken off the transfer list.
- 24 July: The squad numbers for the new season are announced. Richard Naylor is given the number 6 shirt replacing Ľubomír Michalík who moves to number 17. Paul Huntington swaps to number 24 with Patrick Kisnorbo taking his number 3 shirt. Meanwhile, new recruits Jason Crowe and Shane Higgs take the number 2 and 12 jerseys respectively.
- 31 July: Richard Naylor is appointed the new club captain.

=== August ===
- 4 August: Chairman, Ken Bates revealed that the club had agreed a fee with Manchester City for Fabian Delph; however City needed to have the bid approved by their owners in the Gulf and required a week to do so. As a result, Leeds rejected City's bid and accepted another bid from Aston Villa. Delph later agreed terms with Villa and was transferred for a fee worth up to £8 million.
- 6 August: Jonny Howson is announced as the new club vice-captain.

=== September ===
- 5 September: The 2–0 home win against Stockport County sees the club record their best ever start to a season with eight successive victories; the previous best start to a season was in 1973 – the season in which Don Revie won his second First Division title as manager of Leeds. Another club record is beaten with the victory the club's fourteenth successive home league win.
- 17 September: Leeds City Council offer to re-purchase the club's training ground, Thorp Arch, which was sold by the club to businessman Jacob Adler in 2004. The deal would see the Council renting Thorp Arch to the club with an option for the club to purchase the facility at the end of the lease.

=== October ===
- 16 October: The club announce that they chose not to exercise the option of re-purchasing Thorp Arch from Barnaway Ltd. before the 23:59 deadline on 15 October.

=== December ===
- 16 December: The club's stadium, Elland Road is chosen as one of the fourteen venues for the 2018 World Cup should England be successful in being chosen as the host country.

=== January ===
- 3 January: Leeds United make FA Cup history by becoming the first team outside the Premier League to eliminate Manchester United in Alex Ferguson's managerial career. In doing so, Leeds ended a 29-year streak without a win at Old Trafford.
- 6 January: The club confirm that Jermaine Beckford handed in a transfer request on 30 December and that the request was accepted.
- 17 January: Jermaine Beckford withdraws his transfer request, committing himself to the club until the end of his contract at the end of the current season.

=== February ===
- 9 February: Three Leeds players are punched by opposition fans after the club lose to Carlisle United on penalties in the Football League Trophy area final second leg.

=== March ===
- 13 March: The club's youth team finish the Emirates Airlines Dubai Sevens tournament as runners-up having beaten Arsenal, Blackburn Rovers and Celtic in previous rounds. The team lost 2–0 to Olympiacos in the final.

=== April ===
- 3 April: Striker Trésor Kandol is fined by the club after being sent off for violent conduct just twenty seconds after coming on the field of play as a substitute in the 1–0 defeat to Norwich City. The red card is the second Kandol has received this season having been sent-off after the final whistle for violent conduct earlier on in the season.
- 17 April: The club qualify for the League One 2009–10 play-offs after 7th place Colchester United lose to Hartlepool United. Even if Colchester win all of their three remaining games and Leeds lose all of theirs, Colchester would still be three points adrift of Leeds in the final league table.

=== May ===
- 8 May: The club come second in the league and thus finally secure automatic promotion to The Championship after a nailbiting season finale against Bristol Rovers. With Max Gradel sent off in the first half and the club conceding a goal early in the second half, the Leeds fans feared that they would have to settle for a play-off place; but Jonathan Howson and Jermaine Beckford each scored within four minutes to make the score 2–1 to Leeds and secure their promotion.

== Pre-season ==
12 July 2009	York City	3–3	Leeds United	York
13:00 BST	Smith 24'; Lawless 90'; Michalík 90' (o.g.)	Report	Becchio 39'; Whitwell 50'; Milne 82'	Stadium: Bootham Crescent; Attendance: 4,774; Referee: P. Quinn

14 July 2009	Shelbourne	2–2	Leeds United	Drumcondra, Ireland
19:45 BST	Bates 48'; Crawley 56' (pen.)	Report	Beckford 27', 41'	Stadium: Tolka Park; Attendance: 3,343

18 July 2009	Glentoran	1–3	Leeds United	Belfast, Northern Ireland
15:00 BST	Gardinier 58'	Report	Snodgrass 15'; Beckford 45'; Showunmi 82'	Stadium: The Oval; Referee: J. McKnight

21 July 2009	Grimsby Town	1–1	Leeds United	Cleethorpes
19:30 BST	Akpa Akpro 5'	Report	Becchio 50'	Stadium: Blundell Park; Attendance: 3,416; Referee: C. Boyeson

25 July 2009	Leeds United	1–1	Blackburn Rovers	Leeds
15:00 BST (was delayed 15 min.)	Beckford 50'	Report	Gallagher 90' (pen.)	Stadium: Elland Road; Attendance: 11,885; Referee: M. Oliver

29 July 2009	Newcastle United	0–0	Leeds United	Newcastle upon Tyne
19:45 BST		Report		Stadium: St James' Park; Attendance: 16,945; Referee: N. Miller

1 August 2009	Burnley	1–2	Leeds United	Burnley
15:00 BST	Edgar 76'	Report	Grella 37'; Robinson 70'	Stadium: Turf Moor; Attendance: 7,899; Referee: G. Laws

== Competitions ==
=== League One ===
==== League table ====
Pos	Team	Pld	W	D	L	GF	GA	GD	Pts	Promotion, qualification or relegation
1	Norwich City (C, P)	46	29	8	9	89	47	+42	95	Promotion to Football League Championship
2	Leeds United (P)	46	25	11	10	77	44	+33	86	Promotion to Football League Championship
3	Millwall (O, P)	46	24	13	9	76	44	+32	85	Qualification for League One play-offs
4	Charlton Athletic	46	23	15	8	71	48	+23	84	Qualification for League One play-offs
5	Swindon Town	46	22	16	8	73	57	+16	82	Qualification for League One play-offs

Source: The Football League
Rules for classification: 1) points; 2) goal difference; 3) number of goals scored.
(C) Champions; (O) Play-off winners; (P) Promoted

==== Results summary ====
Overall								Home						Away					
Pld	W	D	L	GF	GA	GD	Pts	W	D	L	GF	GA	GD	W	D	L	GF	GA	GD
46	25	11	10	77	44	+33	86	14	6	3	41	19	+22	11	5	7	36	25	+11

Last updated: 3 May 2009.

==== Results by round ====
Round	1	2	3	4	5	6	7	8	9	10	11	12	13	14	15	16	17	18	19	20	21	22	23	24	25	26	27	28	29	30	31	32	33	34	35	36	37	38	39	40	41	42	43	44	45	46
Ground	H	A	A	H	A	H	A	H	A	H	H	H	A	A	H	A	H	A	H	A	H	H	A	H	A	A	H	A	A	H	H	H	A	H	A	A	H	A	H	A	H	A	A	H	A	H
Result	W	W	W	W	W	W	D	W	W	D	D	W	L	W	W	W	W	W	D	D	W	W	W	D	L	L	W	D	D	L	D	W	D	D	W	L	L	L	L	W	W	W	L	W	L	W
Position	6	3	3	2	2	2	2	1	1	1	1	1	1	1	1	1	1	1	1	1	1	1	1	1	1	2	2	2	2	2	2	2	2	2	2	2	2	2	4	4	3	2	2	2	2	2

Updated to match(es) played on 3 May 2009. Source: Competitive Matches
A = Away; H = Home; W = Win; D = Draw; L = Loss

==== Matches ====
8 August 2009	Leeds United	2–1	Exeter City	Leeds
15:00 BST	Beckford 13', 89'		Russell 73'; Corr (red card) 58'	Stadium: Elland Road; Attendance: 27,681; Referee: N. Miller

15 August 2009	Wycombe Wanderers	0–1	Leeds United	High Wycombe
15:00 BST		Report	Becchio 61'	Stadium: Adams Park; Attendance: 8,400; Referee: S. Attwell

18 August 2009	Walsall	1–2	Leeds United	Walsall
19:45 BST	Parkin 80' (pen.)	Report	Johnson 83'; Beckford 87'	Stadium: The Banks' Stadium; Attendance: 8,483; Referee: A. Taylor

22 August 2009	Leeds United	3–0	Tranmere Rovers	Leeds
15:00 BST	Johnson 13'; Beckford 34'; Becchio 86'	Report		Stadium: Elland Road; Attendance: 21,692; Referee: E. Ilderton

29 August 2009	Colchester United	1–2	Leeds United	Colchester
15:00 BST	Lisbie 57' (pen.)	Report	Johnson 47'; Beckford 65'	Stadium: Colchester Community Stadium; Attendance: 8,810; Referee: D Phillip

5 September 2009	Leeds United	2–0	Stockport County	Leeds
15:00 BST	Grella 8'; Michalík 37'; Snodgrass (penalty missed)	Report		Stadium: Elland Road; Attendance: 22,870; Referee: D. McDermid

11 September 2009	Southend United	0–0	Leeds United	Southend-on-Sea
19:45 BST	Barnard (penalty missed)	Report		Stadium: Roots Hall; Attendance: 10,123; Referee: P. Taylor

19 September 2009	Leeds United	4–1	Gillingham	Leeds
15:00 BST	Johnson 14', 28'; Howson 46'; Beckford 80'	Report	Barcham 50'	Stadium: Elland Road; Attendance: 21,026; Referee: G. Salisbury

26 September 2009	Milton Keynes Dons	0–1	Leeds United	Milton Keynes
15:00 BST	Puncheon (red card) 45'	Report	Snodgrass 90+2'	Stadium: stadium:mk Attendance: 16,713; Referee: A. D'Urso

29 September 2009	Leeds United	1–1	Carlisle United	Leeds
19:45 BST	Beckford 30', (penalty missed)	Report	Dobie 50'	Stadium: Elland Road; Attendance: 19,673; Referee: R. Booth

3 October 2009	Leeds United	0–0	Charlton Athletic	Leeds
15:00 BST		Report		Stadium: Elland Road; Attendance: 31,838; Referee: S. Mathieson

19 October 2009	Leeds United	2–1	Norwich City	Leeds
19:45 BST	Johnson 15'; Beckford 90+2'	Report	Holt 38'	Stadium: Elland Road; Attendance: 19,912; Referee: L. Mason

24 October 2009	Millwall	2–1	Leeds United	Bermondsey
15:00 BST	Harris 3'; Alexander 83'	Report	Kisnorbo 11'	Stadium: The Den; Attendance: 14,165; Referee: M. Clattenburg

27 October 2009	Bristol Rovers	0–4	Leeds United	Bristol
19:45 GMT		Report	Beckford 9', 65'; Vokes 55'; Kandol 87'	Stadium: Memorial Stadium; Attendance: 11,448; Referee: A. Woolmer

31 October 2009	Leeds United	4–0	Yeovil Town	Leeds
15:00 GMT	Johnson 42'; Gradel 69'; Beckford 79'; Kandol 84'	Report		Stadium: Elland Road; Attendance: 24,482; Referee: A. Haines

21 November 2009	Brighton & Hove Albion	0–3	Leeds United	Brighton
15:00 GMT		Report	Snodgrass 27'; Beckford 43'; Kilkenny 90'	Stadium: Withdean Stadium; Attendance: 7,615; Referee: J. Linington

24 November 2009	Leeds United	1–0	Leyton Orient	Leeds
19:45 GMT	Gradel 88'	Report		Stadium: Elland Road; Attendance: 19,744; Referee: D. Foster

1 December 2009	Oldham Athletic	0–2	Leeds United	Oldham
19:45 GMT		Report	Kilkenny 37'; Becchio 82'	Stadium: Boundary Park; Attendance: 7,793; Referee: C. Webster

5 December 2009	Leeds United	2–2	Huddersfield Town	Leeds
12:15 GMT	Snodgrass 2'; Gradel 66'	Report	Novak 48'; Rhodes 78'	Stadium: Elland Road; Attendance: 36,723; Referee: M. Jones

12 December 2009	Brentford	0–0	Leeds United	Brentford
15:00 GMT		Report		Stadium: Griffin Park; Attendance: 9,031; Referee: D. Deadman

19 December 2009	Leeds United	1–0	Southampton	Leeds
15:00 GMT	Snodgrass 77'	Report		Stadium: Elland Road; Attendance: 25,948; Referee: N. Miller

26 December 2009	Leeds United	3–1	Hartlepool United	Leeds
15:00 GMT	Beckford 38', 69'; Becchio 45+3'	Report	Björnsson 25'	Stadium: Elland Road; Attendance: 30,191; Referee: E. Ilderton

28 December 2009	Stockport County	2–4	Leeds United	Stockport
12:00 GMT	Baker 12'; Mullins 61'; Poole (red card) 90+6'	Report	Snodgrass 2'; Beckford 67', 90+3'; Bromby 87'	Stadium: Edgeley Park; Attendance: 7,786; Referee: K. Friend

9 January 2010	Leeds United	1–1	Wycombe Wanderers	Leeds
15:00 GMT	Howson 4'	Report	Pittman 63'	Stadium: Elland Road; Attendance: 24,383; Referee: D. Webb

16 January 2010	Exeter City	2–0	Leeds United	Exeter
15:00 GMT	Harley 4', 83'	Report		Stadium: St James Park; Attendance: 8,549; Referee: G. Stott

26 January 2010	Swindon Town	3–0	Leeds United	Swindon
19:45 GMT	Austin 13'; Paynter 60', 63' (pen.)	Report		Stadium: The County Ground; Attendance: 14,508; Referee: P. Gibbs

31 January 2010	Leeds United	2–0	Colchester United	Leeds
15:00 GMT	Beckford 38' (pen.), 55'	Report		Stadium: Elland Road; Attendance: 23,425; Referee: K. Woolmer

6 February 2010	Hartlepool United	2–2	Leeds United	Hartlepool
15:00 GMT	Boyd 71'; Sweeney 90+3'	Report	Becchio 23', 78'	Stadium: Victoria Park; Attendance: 5,115; Referee: S. Mathieson

13 February 2010	Leyton Orient	1–1	Leeds United	Leyton
15:00 GMT	Mkandawire 83'	Report	Daniels 90+5' (o.g.)	Stadium: Brisbane Road; Attendance: 8,013; Referee: R. East

16 February 2010	Leeds United	1–2	Walsall	Leeds
19:45 GMT	McSheffrey 54'	Report	Mattis 46'; McDonald 81'	Stadium: Elland Road; Attendance: 18,941; Referee: J. Singh

20 February 2010	Leeds United	1–1	Brighton & Hove Albion	Leeds
15:00 GMT	Snodgrass 90+5'	Report	Murray 76' (pen.); Virgo (red card) 80'	Stadium: Elland Road; Attendance: 24,120; Referee: C. Boyeson

23 February 2010	Leeds United	2–0	Oldham Athletic	Leeds
19:45 GMT	Becchio 54', 61'	Report		Stadium: Elland Road; Attendance: 17,635; Referee: P. Taylor

27 February 2010	Huddersfield Town	2–2	Leeds United	Huddersfield
12:30 GMT	Pilkington 13'; Roberts 85'	Report	Howson 61'; Becchio 66'	Stadium: Galpharm Stadium; Attendance: 21,764; Referee: K. Friend

6 March 2010	Leeds United	1–1	Brentford	Leeds
15:00 GMT	Beckford 72'	Report	Strevens 60'	Stadium: Elland Road; Attendance: 25,445; Referee: O. Langford

9 March 2010	Tranmere Rovers	1–4	Leeds United	Birkenhead
19:45 GMT	Welsh 13'	Report	Snodgrass 9'; Beckford 16' (pen.), 65'; Becchio 34'	Stadium: Prenton Park; Attendance: 8,346; Referee: R. Shoebridge

13 March 2010	Southampton	1–0	Leeds United	Southampton
15:00 GMT	Harding 25'	Report		Stadium: St Mary's Stadium; Attendance: 30,794; Referee: P. Walton

22 March 2010	Leeds United	0–2	Millwall	Leeds
19:45 GMT		Report	Morison 11'; Batt 80'	Stadium: Elland Road; Attendance: 21,348; Referee: C. Foy

27 March 2010	Norwich City	1–0	Leeds United	Norwich
15:00 GMT	C. Martin 89'	Report		Stadium: Carrow Road; Attendance: 25,445; Referee: L. Probert

3 April 2010	Leeds United	0–3	Swindon Town	Leeds
15:00 BST		Report	Paynter 43', 48'; Austin 55'	Stadium: Elland Road; Attendance: 27,881; Referee: M. Russell

5 April 2010	Yeovil Town	1–2	Leeds United	Yeovil
12:30 BST	Bowditch 66'	Report	Naylor 29', 34'	Stadium: Huish Park; Attendance: 6,308; Referee: K. Wright

10 April 2010	Leeds United	2–0	Southend United	Leeds
15:00 BST	Gradel 60'; Becchio 83'	Report		Stadium: Elland Road; Attendance: 21,650; Referee: E. Ilderton

13 April 2010	Carlisle United	1–3	Leeds United	Carlisle
19:45 BST	Keogh 43'	Report	Becchio 13', 51'; Gradel 47'	Stadium: Brunton Park; Attendance: 8,728; Referee: M. Halsey

17 April 2010	Gillingham	3–2	Leeds United	Gillingham
15:00 BST	Miller 8'; Bentley 30'; Naylor 33' (o.g.)	Report	Becchio 45'; Beckford 87' (pen.)	Stadium: Priestfield; Attendance: 9,649; Referee: A. Wiley

24 April 2010	Leeds United	4–1	Milton Keynes Dons	Leeds
15:00 BST	Becchio 13'; Gradel 33'; Beckford 80', 87' (pen.)	Report	Lewington 19'; Doumbé (red card) 43'; McCracken (red card) 84'; Leven (red card) 92'	Stadium: Elland Road; Attendance: 25,964; Referee: M. Oliver

1 May 2010	Charlton Athletic	1–0	Leeds United	London
15:00 BST	Naylor 88' (o.g.)	Report		Stadium: The Valley; Attendance: 23,198; Referee: L. Probert

8 May 2010	Leeds United	2–1	Bristol Rovers	Leeds
15:00 BST	Howson 59'; Beckford 63'; Gradel (red card) 33'	Report	Duffy 48'	Stadium: Elland Road; Attendance: 38,234; Referee: G. Salisbury

=== FA Cup ===
7 November 2009 First round	Oldham Athletic	0–2	Leeds United	Oldham
17:15 BST		Report	Howson 37'; Grella 90+4'	Stadium: Boundary Park; Attendance: 5,552; Referee: G. Ward

29 November 2009 Second round	Kettering Town	1–1	Leeds United	Kettering
13:45 GMT	Roper 63'	Report	Beckford 78'	Stadium: Rockingham Road; Attendance: 4,837; Referee: A. D'Urso

8 December 2009 Second round (replay)	Leeds United	5–1 (a.e.t.)	Kettering Town	Leeds
20:00 GMT	Becchio 20'; Grella 108', 116'; Kandol 109'; Beckford 119'	Report	Elding 62'	Stadium: Elland Road; Attendance: 10,670; Referee: M. Crossley

3 January 2010 Third round	Manchester United	0–1	Leeds United	Manchester
13:00 GMT		Report	Beckford 19'	Stadium: Old Trafford; Attendance: 74,526 (9,000 away); Referee: C. Foy

23 January 2010 Fourth round	Tottenham Hotspur	2–2	Leeds United	London
17:15	Crouch 42'; Pavlyuchenko 75'	Report	Beckford 52', 90+6' (pen.)	Stadium: White Hart Lane; Attendance: 35,750; Referee: A. Wiley

3 February 2010 Fourth round (replay)	Leeds United	1–3	Tottenham Hotspur	Leeds
19:45 GMT	Becchio 45+1'	Report	Defoe 37', 73', 90+3'	Stadium: Elland Road; Attendance: 37,704; Referee: A. Marriner

=== League Cup ===
10 August 2009 First round	Darlington	0–1	Leeds United	Darlington
19:45 BST		Report	Showunmi 54'	Stadium: The Darlington Arena; Attendance: 4,487; Referee: N. Swarbrick

25 August 2009 Second round	Leeds United	2–1 (a.e.t.)	Watford	Leeds
19:45 BST	Snodgrass 38', 98'	Report	Sordell 86'	Stadium: Elland Road; Attendance: 14,681; Referee: A. Hall

22 September 2009 Third round	Leeds United	0–1	Liverpool	Leeds
19:45 BST		Report	Ngog 65'	Stadium: Elland Road; Attendance: 38,168; Referee: A. Wiley

=== Football League Trophy ===
6 October 2009 North-east Second round	Leeds United	2–1	Darlington	Leeds
19:45 BST	Robinson 24'; Kandol 28'	Report	Convery 45'; Liversedge (red card) 90+3'	Stadium: Elland Road; Attendance: 8,429; Referee: A. Taylor

10 November 2009 Northern quarter-final	Leeds United	3–1	Grimsby Town	Leeds
19:45 GMT	Lancashire 40' (o.g.); Kilkenny 45'; Beckford 54'	Report	Sweeney 56'	Stadium: Elland Road; Attendance: 10,430; Referee: N. Swarbrick

15 December 2009 Northern semi-final	Leeds United	2–0	Accrington Stanley	Leeds
19:45 GMT	Ephraim 9'; Kilkenny 50'	Report		Stadium: Elland Road; Attendance: 12,696; Referee: M. Russell

19 January 2010 Northern final (1st leg)	Leeds United	1–2	Carlisle United	Leeds
19:45 GMT	Crowe 56'	Report	Kavanagh 21'; Anyinsah 84'	Stadium: Elland Road; Attendance: 13,011; Referee: A. Penn

9 February 2010 Northern final (2nd leg)	Carlisle United	2–3 (6–5 p)	Leeds United	Carlisle
19:00 GMT	Clayton 33'; Hurst 72'	Report	Snodgrass 46'; Crowe 80'; Grella 86'	Stadium: Brunton Park; Attendance: 9,430; Referee: A. Hall
	Penalties
	Harte (penalty scored); Hurst (penalty scored); Madine (penalty scored); Keogh (penalty missed); Clayton (penalty scored); Horwood (penalty scored); Robson (penalty scored)		(penalty missed) Johnson; (penalty scored) Snodgrass; (penalty scored) McSheffrey; (penalty scored) Grella; (penalty scored) Gradel; (penalty scored) Kilkenny; (penalty missed) Lowry

== First-team squad ==
=== Squad information ===
N	Pos.	Nat.	Name	Age	Since	App	Goals	Ends	Transfer fee	Notes
1	GK	(Denmark)	Casper Ankergren	30	2007	143	0	2010	£200k	
2	DF	(England)	Jason Crowe	31	2009	27	2	2011	Free	
3	DF	(Australia)	Patrick Kisnorbo	29	2009	35	1	2011	Free	
4	MF	(Republic of Ireland)	Michael Doyle	28	2009	52	0	2010	Loan	
5	DF	(Angola)	Rui Marques	32	2005	100	4	2010	Free	
6	DF	(England)	Richard Naylor (captain)	33	2009	61	3	2011	Free	
7	FW	(Scotland)	Paul Dickov	37	2010	4	0	2010	Free	
8	MF	(Australia) (England)	Neil Kilkenny	24	2008	105	9	2011	£150k	
9	FW	(England)	Jermaine Beckford	26	2006	152	85	2010	£ 45k	
10	FW	(Argentina)	Luciano Becchio	26	2008	103	36	2011	£300k	
11	DF	(Republic of Ireland)	Alan Sheehan	23	2008	24	2	2011	Undisclosed	
12	GK	(England)	Shane Higgs	32	2009	22	0	2011	Free	
13	FW	(United States)	Mike Grella	23	2009	40	5	2012	Free	
14	MF	(England)	Jonathan Howson (VC)	21	2006	153	17	2011	Youth system	
15	FW	(England)	Gary McSheffrey	27	2010	11	1	2010	Loan	
16	MF	(England)	Bradley Johnson	23	2008	91	11	2011	£250k	
17	DF	(Slovakia)	Ľubomír Michalík^{1}	26	2007	76	2	2011	£200k	
18	MF	(England)	Andy Robinson	30	2008	50	7	2011	Free	
19	DF	(England)	Ben Parker	22	2007	50	1	2012	Youth system	
20	FW	(Democratic Republic of the Congo) (Zaire)	Trésor Kandol	28	2006	79	16	2011	£200k	
21	DF	(Australia)	Shane Lowry	20	2010	12	0	2010	Loan	
22	MF	(England)	Andrew Hughes	32	2007	126	1	2010	£300k	
23	FW	(Scotland)	Robert Snodgrass	22	2008	108	21	2013	£ 35k	
24	MF	(England)	Sanchez Watt	19	2010	6	0	2010	Loan	
25	GK	(Scotland)	Alan Martin	21	2007	0	0	2011	Undisclosed	
26	DF	(England)	Leigh Bromby	29	2009	37	1	2013	£250k	
27	FW	(South Africa)	Davide Somma	25	2009	1	0	2011	Free	
28	MF	(Ivory Coast)	Max Gradel^{1}	22	2009	35	6	2012	£250k	
29	FW	(England)	Tom Elliott	20	2007	4	0	2011	Youth system	
30	MF	(England)	Will Hatfield	18	2009	0	0	2010	Youth system	
32	DF	(England)	Aidan White	18	2008	23	0	2012	Youth system	
33	DF	(Scotland)	Neill Collins	26	2010	9	0	2010	Loan	
34	GK	(England)	Ryan Jones	18	2008	0	0	n/a^{2}	Youth system	

- Last updated: 10 May 2010
- Ordered by Squad Number.

Appearances (starts and substitute appearances) and goals include those in The Championship (and playoffs), League One (and playoffs), FA Cup, League Cup and Football League Trophy.
^{1}Player first came to the club on loan and was transferred the following year.
^{2}Player joined the club in 2008 as a scholar. He is presently a 2nd year scholar and is not currently signed to the club on professional terms.
Squad includes players registered with the club on the last day of the season (8 May 2010) only.

=== Squad stats ===
				Total				League One		FA Cup		FL Cup		Football League Trophy		
N	Pos.	Name	Nat.	GS	App	Gls	Min	App	Gls	App	Gls	App	Gls	App	Gls	Notes
1	GK	Ankergren	(Denmark)	36	38		3461	28		6				4		
2	RB	Crowe	(England)	25	27	2	2099	17		4		3		3	2	
3	CB	Kisnorbo	(Australia)	33	34	1	3021	28	1	3		2		1		
4	CM	Doyle	(Republic of Ireland)	49	50		4436	40		6		3		1		
5	CB	Rui Marques	(Angola)	6	6		567	5				1				
6	CB	Naylor	(England)	35	36	2	3275	28	2	3				5		
7	CM	Prutton	(England)	3	9		329	6						3		
7	FW	Dickov	(Scotland)	1	7		124	4						3		
8	CM	Kilkenny	(Australia) (England)	32	47	4	3241	34	2	5		3		5	2	
9	FW	Beckford	(England)	46	50	31	4274	40	25	6	5	2		2	1	
10	FW	Becchio	(Argentina)	37	46	17	3189	36	15	5	2	3		2		
11	LB	Sheehan	(Republic of Ireland)													
12	GK	Higgs	(England)	22	22		1909	19				3				
13	FW	Grella	(United States)	9	27	5	917	16	1	4	3	3		4	1	
14	CM	Howson	(England)	49	56	4	4566	45	3	6	1	3		2		Also played RM
15	FW	Vokes	(Wales) (England)	9	10	1	714	8	1					2		
15	LW	McSheffrey	(England)	9	10	1	845	9	1					1		
16	LM	Johnson	(England)	34	46	7	3217	35	7	4		3		4		Also played CM
17	CB	Michalík	(Slovakia)	16	23	1	1704	13	1	4		2		4		
18	LW	Robinson	(England)	1	9	1	244	6				1		2	1	Also played RW
19	LB	Parker	(England)	2	4		152	4								
20	FW	Kandol	(Democratic Republic of the Congo) (Zaire)	2	13	4	261	10	2	1	1			2	1	
21	FW	Showunmi	(Nigeria) (England)	1	12	1	256	7				3	1	2		
21	LB	Lowry	(Australia)	11	11		1025	10						1		
22	LB	Hughes	(England)	49	50		4309	38		5		3		4		Also played RB
23	RW	Snodgrass	(Scotland)	53	56	9	4517	43	6	6		3	2	4	1	Also played LW
24	CB	Huntington	(England)	1	1		90					1				
24	LW	Watt	(England)	1	7		121	6						1		
25	GK	A. Martin	(Scotland)													
26	RB	Bromby	(England)	38	39	1	3416	32	1	5				2		Also played CB
27	FW	Somma	(South Africa)		1		20							1		
28	RW	Gradel	(Ivory Coast)	13	34	6	1522	31	6					3		Also played FW
29	FW	Elliott	(England)													
30	GK	Fielding	(England)													
30	LB	Capaldi	(Northern Ireland) (Norway)	4	5		424	3		2						
30	CM	Will Hatfield	(England)													
31	CB	Webb	(England)													
32	LB	White	(England)	7	14		679	8		4				2		Also played LM
33	CM	Josh Falkingham	(England)													
33	CB	Collins	(Scotland)	9	9		810	9								
34	GK	Ryan Jones	(England)													
35	RW	Ephraim	(England)	2	4	1	183	3						1	1	
36	GK	D. Martin	(England)	1	1		90							1		

Last updated: 10 May 2010
Ordered by Squad Numbers
0 shown as blank

=== Disciplinary record ===
N	Pos.	Nat.	Name	Yellow card	Second yellow card	Red card	Notes
16	MF	(England)	Johnson	12			
4	MF	(Republic of Ireland)	Doyle	10			
23	MF	(Scotland)	Snodgrass	9			
26	DF	(England)	Bromby	8			
6	DF	(England)	Naylor	8			
28	MF	(Ivory Coast)	Gradel	5		1	
9	FW	(England)	Beckford	6			
2	DF	(England)	Crowe	6			
10	FW	(Argentina)	Becchio	5			
8	MF	(Australia) (England)	Kilkenny	5			
3	DF	(Australia)	Kisnorbo	5			
14	MF	(England)	Howson	5			
21	DF	(Australia)	Lowry	4			
33	DF	(Scotland)	Collins	3			
22	DF	(England)	Hughes	3			
20	FW	(Democratic Republic of the Congo)	Kandol			1	
1	GK	(Denmark)	Ankergren	2			
30	DF	(Northern Ireland) (Norway)	Capaldi	2			
17	DF	(Slovenia)	Michalík	2			
21	FW	(Nigeria) (England)	Showunmi	1			

Last updated: 10 May 2010
Only competitive matches
(yellow card) = Number of bookings; (second yellow card) = Number of sending offs after a second yellow card; (red card) = Number of sending offs by a direct red card.

==== Suspensions ====
No.	P	Name	No. Matches Banned	Reason for Suspension	Notes
4	MF	Doyle	1	Five yellow cards	
20	FW	Kandol	3	Violent conduct	Incident happened on the field of play after the final whistle of a match. Suspension handed after match.
23	MF	Snodgrass	1	Five yellow cards	
26	DF	Bromby	1	Five yellow cards	
20	FW	Kandol	4	Red card (violent conduct)	
16	MF	Johnson	2	Ten yellow cards	
28	MF	Gradel	3	Red card (violent conduct)	Suspension to start at the beginning of the 2010–11 season.
4	MF	Doyle	2	Ten yellow cards	Suspension to start at the beginning of the 2010–11 season.

== Transfers ==
=== In ===
No.	Pos.	Nat.	Name	Age	EU	Moving from	Type	Transfer window	Ends	Transfer fee	Source
2	DF	(England)	Jason Crowe	30	EU	Northampton Town	Free Agent	Summer	2011	Free	
12	GK	(England)	Shane Higgs	32	EU	Cheltenham Town	Transferred	Summer	2010	Free	
3	DF	(Australia)	Patrick Kisnorbo	28	Non-EU	Leicester City	Free Agent	Summer	2011	Free	
26	DF	(England)	Leigh Bromby	29	EU	Sheffield United	Transferred	Summer	2013	£250k^{1}	
27	FW	(South Africa)	Davide Somma	24	Non-EU	San Jose Earthquakes (United States)	Transferred	Summer	2010^{2}	Free	
28	MF	(Ivory Coast)	Max Gradel	22	Non-EU	Leicester City	Transferred	Winter	2012	£250k	
7	FW	(Scotland)	Paul Dickov	37	EU	Leicester City	Free Agent	Winter	2010	Free	

^{1}Transfer fee was officially undisclosed, however it was reported by The Times that the fee was £250,000.
^{2}The club has the option of extending the player's contact by an additional year.

=== Loans in ===
No.	Pos.	Name	Country	Age	Loan club	Started	Ended	Start source	End source
4	MF	Michael Doyle	(Republic of Ireland)	28	Coventry City	6 Aug	8 May		
30	GK	Frank Fielding	(England)	21	Blackburn Rovers	29 Sep	26 Oct		
15	FW	Sam Vokes	(Wales) (England)	20	Wolverhampton Wanderers	19 Oct	1 Jan		
28	MF	Max Gradel	(Ivory Coast)	22	Leicester City	19 Oct	19 Jan		
35	MF	Hogan Ephraim	(England)	21	Queens Park Rangers	26 Nov	1 Jan		
36	GK	David Martin	(England)	24	Liverpool	26 Nov	10 Feb		
30	DF	Tony Capaldi	(Northern Ireland) (Norway)	28	Cardiff City	26 Nov	4 Jan		
15	FW	Gary McSheffrey	(England)	27	Birmingham City	29 Jan	8 May		
21	DF	Shane Lowry	(Australia)	20	Aston Villa	29 Jan	8 May		
33	DF	Neill Collins	(Scotland)	26	Preston North End	23 Mar	8 May		
25	MF	Sanchez Watt	(England)	19	Arsenal	25 Mar	8 May		

Sources: For loan start source see "Start source". For loan end source see "End source".
EU = if holds or not a European Union passport; Country: when 2 flags, 1st flag = country that plays for internationally, 2nd flag = country of birth; No. = number on jersey; P = Position (for position name, pause mouse pointer on abbreviation); Name = Name on jersey (for more extensive name, pause mouse pointer on name); In/Out = In: The player came in on loan, Out: The player went out on loan; Loan club = the club that the player moved on loan to or the club that the player came from on loan; Started = the date when the player's loan started; Ended = the date when the player's loan ended.

=== Loans out ===
No.	Pos.	Name	Country	Age	Loan club	Started	Ended	Start source	End source
24	GK	Alan Martin	(Scotland)	20	Accrington Stanley	30 Jul	26 Oct		
—	DF	Tom Lees	(England)	19	Accrington Stanley	1 Sep	8 May		
11	DF	Alan Sheehan	(Republic of Ireland)	23	Oldham Athletic	2 Sep	2 Nov		
24	DF	Paul Huntington	(England)	22	Stockport County	10 Sep	12 Nov		
29	FW	Tom Elliott	(England)	19	Bury	16 Sep	8 May		
—	MF	Ollie Hotchkiss	(England)	20	Mansfield Town	16 Oct	13 Jan		
—	DF	Andrew Milne	(England)	19	Darlington	26 Nov	14 Dec		
11	DF	Alan Sheehan	(Republic of Ireland)	39	Swindon Town	26 Nov			
27	FW	Davide Somma	(South Africa)	24	Chesterfield	26 Nov	5 Jan		
7	MF	David Prutton	(England)	28	Colchester United	26 Jan	1 Feb		
27	FW	Davide Somma	(South Africa)	25	Lincoln City	27 Feb	8 May		
18	MF	Andy Robinson	(England)	30	Tranmere Rovers	25 Mar	8 May		
—	DF	Liam Darville	(England)	35	Rotherham United	25 Mar			

Sources: For loan start source see "Start source". For loan end source see "End source".
EU = if holds or not a European Union passport; Country: when 2 flags, 1st flag = country that plays for internationally, 2nd flag = country of birth; No. = number on jersey; P = Position (for position name, pause mouse pointer on abbreviation); Name = Name on jersey (for more extensive name, pause mouse pointer on name); In/Out = In: The player came in on loan, Out: The player went out on loan; Loan club = the club that the player moved on loan to or the club that the player came from on loan; Started = the date when the player's loan started; Ended = the date when the player's loan ended.

=== Out ===
No.	Pos.	Name	Country	Age	Type	Moving to	Transfer window	Transfer fee	Apps	Goals	Source
4	MF	Jonathan Douglas	(Republic of Ireland)	27	Out of Contract	Swindon Town	Summer	n/a	166	11	
12	GK	David Lucas	(England)	31	Out of Contract	Swindon Town	Summer	n/a	23	0	
2	DF	Frazer Richardson	(England)	26	Out of Contract	Charlton Athletic	Summer	n/a	173	5	
24	MF	Peter Sweeney	(Scotland)	24	Released	Grimsby Town	Summer	n/a	9	0	
—	DF	Luke Garbutt	(England)	16	Transferred	Everton	Summer	£1.55m^{1}	0	0	
15	MF	Fabian Delph	(England)	19	Transferred	Aston Villa	Summer	£8m^{2}	54	6	
—	DF	Louis Hutton	(England)	14	Transferred	Manchester City	Summer	£ 400k^{3}	0	0	
—	DF	George Swann	(England)	14	Transferred	Manchester City	Summer	£ 400k^{3}	0	0	
31	MF	Jonathan Webb	(England)	20	Out of Contract		Winter	n/a	1	0	
33	MF	Josh Falkingham	(England)	19	Out of Contract	St Johnstone (Scotland)	Winter	n/a	0	0	
—	MF	Ollie Hotchkiss	(England)	20	Released	Mansfield Town	Winter	n/a	0	0	
21	FW	Enoch Showunmi	(Nigeria) (England)	27	Released	Falkirk (Scotland)	Winter	n/a	28	6	
7	MF	David Prutton	(England)	28	Released	Colchester United	Winter	n/a	78	4	
24	DF	Paul Huntington	(England)	22	Released	Stockport County	Winter	n/a	32	2	

EU = if holds or not a European Union passport; Country: when 2 flags, 1st flag = country that plays for internationally, 2nd flag = country of birth; N = number on jersey; P = Position (for position name, pause mouse pointer on abbreviation); Name = Name on jersey (for more extensive name, pause mouse pointer on name); Age = age on the day of the signing; Moving from = only indicate the club the player was playing before start playing for this club in this season, for the type of the moving see Status column; Moving to = only indicates the club the player is going to play next, for the type of the moving see Status column; Ends = when the player's current contract ends; n/a = Not applicable.
^{1}The Professional Football Compensation Committee decided that Everton should pay Leeds an initial compensation fee of £600,000 followed by £200,000 upon Garbutt's first full international appearance and £150,000 after the player has made 5, 10, 20, 30 and 40 appearances (thus totalling £750,000 from this final clause). It was also ruled that Leeds should receive 20% of any profit that Everton makes from future sale of the player.
^{2}Transfer fee was officially undisclosed, however it was reported by The Guardian that the fee was approximately an upfront £6 million with an additional £2 million in variables.
^{3}The total compensation fee for the two academy players was reported to be £800,000.

=== New Contracts ===
No.	Pos.	Nat.	Name	Age	Status	Contract length	Expiry date	Source
31	DF	(England)	Jonathan Webb	19	Signed	6 months	Nov 2009	
33	MF	(England)	Josh Falkingham	18	Signed	6 months	Nov 2009	
4	MF	(Republic of Ireland)	Jonathan Douglas	27	Rejected	Unknown	n/a	
9	FW	(England)	Jermaine Beckford	25	Rejected	3 years	n/a	
19	DF	(England)	Ben Parker	22	Signed	3 years	July 2012	
23	MF	(Scotland)	Robert Snodgrass	21	Signed	4 years	August 2013	
13	FW	(United States)	Mike Grella	22	Signed	3 years	August 2012	
12	GK	(England)	Shane Higgs	32	Signed	1 year	July 2011	
—	DF	(England)	Tom Lees	19	Signed	2 years	February 2012	
27	FW	(South Africa)	Davide Somma	25	Signed	1 year	April 2011	

== Awards ==
=== Internal Awards ===
==== Official Player of the Year Awards ====
The results of the 2009–10 Leeds United F.C. Player of the Year Awards were announced at a dinner on 8 May 2010 at Elland Road.

- Player of the Year: Patrick Kisnorbo
- Young Player of the Year: Aidan White
- Players' Player of the Year: Patrick Kisnorbo
- Goal of the Season: Jermaine Beckford (vs Manchester United, 3 January)
- Best Contribution to Community: Leigh Bromby, Jonathan Howson and Ben Parker
- Chairman's Special Award: Ben Parker

=== External Awards ===
==== League One Team of the Week ====
The following Leeds players have been selected in the official League One team of the week.

- 10 August: Jermaine Beckford, Michael Doyle
- 17 August: Shane Higgs, Andy Hughes
- 24 August: Jason Crowe, Bradley Johnson
- 31 August: Jermaine Beckford, Bradley Johnson
- 7 September: Jason Crowe
- 21 September: Jonny Howson, Bradley Johnson
- 28 September: Patrick Kisnorbo
- 2 November: Richard Naylor
- 23 November: Jermaine Beckford, Neil Kilkenny, Robert Snodgrass
- 7 December: Robert Snodgrass
- 21 December: Leigh Bromby, Robert Snodgrass
- 1 February: Jermaine Beckford, Richard Naylor
- 8 February: Luciano Becchio
- 6 April: Richard Naylor
- 26 April: Luciano Becchio

==== Other Awards ====
- PFA Team of the Year (League One): Patrick Kisnorbo, Robert Snodgrass
- PFA Fans' Player of the Month (League One): Robert Snodgrass (August/September), Jermaine Beckford (October, December)
- League One Player of the Year: Jermaine Beckford
- LMA Performance of the Week Award: vs Manchester United (3 January, 1–0, FA Cup)
- Johnstone's Paint Trophy Ultimate Finish Award: Neil Kilkenny (vs Accrington Stanley, 15 December)
- Yorkshire Evening Post Player of the Year (Leeds United): Patrick Kisnorbo
