= 2007–08 Leeds United F.C. season =

2007–08 season of Leeds United

Leeds United
2007–08 season
- Chairman: Ken Bates
- Manager: Dennis Wise (until 28 January); Gwyn Williams (caretaker, until 29 Jan); Gary McAllister (from 29 January)
- Stadium: Elland Road
- League One: 5th (qualified for play-offs)
- Play-offs: Runners-up
- FA Cup: First round
- League Cup: Second round
- League Trophy: Area quarter-finals
- Top goalscorer: League: Jermaine Beckford (20); All: Jermaine Beckford (20)
- Highest home attendance: 38,256 vs Gillingham (3 May 2008, League One)
- Lowest home attendance: 11,315 vs Hereford United (20 November 2007, FA Cup)
- Average home league attendance: 26,040

The 2007–08 season saw Leeds United competing in League One (known as the Coca-Cola Football League for sponsorship reasons) following relegation the previous season.

== Competitions ==
=== League One ===
==== League table ====
Pos	Team	Pld	W	D	L	GF	GA	GD	Pts	Promotion, qualification or relegation
3	Doncaster Rovers (O, P)	46	23	11	12	65	41	+24	80	Qualification for League One play-offs
4	Carlisle United	46	23	11	12	64	46	+18	80	Qualification for League One play-offs
5	Leeds United	46	27	10	9	72	38	+34	76 (Note: Leeds deducted 15 points for failure to comply with rules on insolvency.)	Qualification for League One play-offs
6	Southend United	46	22	10	14	70	55	+15	76	Qualification for League One play-offs
7	Brighton & Hove Albion	46	19	12	15	58	50	+8	69	

Updated to match(es) played on unknown. Source: The Football League
Rules for classification: 1) points; 2) goal difference; 3) number of goals scored.
(O) Play-off winners; (P) Promoted

==== Results summary ====
Overall								Home						Away					
Pld	W	D	L	GF	GA	GD	Pts	W	D	L	GF	GA	GD	W	D	L	GF	GA	GD
46	27	10	9	72	38	+34	76	15	4	4	41	18	+23	12	6	5	31	20	+11

Source: Statto

==== Results by round ====
Round	1	2	3	4	5	6	7	8	9	10	11	12	13	14	15	16	17	18	19	20	21	22	23	24	25	26	27	28	29	30	31	32	33	34	35	36	37	38	39	40	41	42	43	44	45	46
Ground	A	H	A	H	H	A	H	A	A	H	H	A	H	A	A	H	A	H	H	A	H	A	A	H	H	A	H	A	A	H	A	H	H	A	H	H	A	H	H	A	A	H	A	A	A	H
Result	W	W	W	W	W	W	W	D	W	W	D	W	W	L	W	W	L	W	W	D	W	D	L	L	W	W	L	D	L	L	D	D	D	W	W	L	D	W	D	W	W	W	L	W	W	W
Position	24	24	24	24	24	20	18	20	14	12	12	9	6	9	7	4	5	5	5	5	3	3	3	5	4	3	5	5	6	8	8	7	9	8	7	7	10	8	8	7	6	6	6	6	6	5

Source: Statto.com
A = Away; H = Home; W = Win; D = Draw; L = Loss

=== League One ===
Date	Opponent	Venue	Result F–A	Scorers	Attendance	Ref.
11 August 2007	Tranmere Rovers	Away	2–1	Heath 55', Kandol 89'	11,008	
18 August 2007	Southend United	Home	4–1	Thompson 3', Flo 85', Marques 88', Beckford 90'	24,036	
25 August 2007	Nottingham Forest	Away	2–1	Kandol 17', Beckford 89'	25,237	
1 September 2007	Luton Town	Home	1–0	Kandol 44'	26,856	
8 September 2007	Hartlepool United	Home	2–0	Kandol 20', Beckford 50'	26,877	
14 September 2007	Bristol Rovers	Away	3–0	Beckford 9', 90', Kandol 77'	11,883	
22 September 2007	Swansea City	Home	2–0	Beckford 62', Prutton 67'	29,467	
29 September 2007	Gillingham	Away	1–1	Carole 28'	8,719	
2 October 2007	Oldham Athletic	Away	1–0	Westlake 90'	10,054	
6 October 2007	Yeovil Town	Home	1–0	de Vries 89'	27,808	
13 October 2007	Leyton Orient	Home	1–1	Carole 55'	29,177	
20 October 2007	Brighton & Hove Albion	Away	1–0	Kandol 79'	8,691	
27 October 2007	Millwall	Home	4–2	Prutton 37', Beckford 53', Douglas 57', 60'	30,319	
3 November 2007	Carlisle United	Away	1–3	Beckford 28'	16,668	
6 November 2007	Bournemouth	Away	3–1	Kandol 4', 86', Carole 54'	9,632	
17 November 2007	Swindon Town	Home	2–1	Beckford 32' pen., 56'	27,990	
25 November 2007	Cheltenham Town	Away	0–1	—	7,043	
4 December 2007	Port Vale	Home	3–0	Prutton 18', Beckford 55', Flo 83'	20,301	
8 December 2007	Huddersfield Town	Home	4–0	Douglas 24', Beckford 49', 69', Flo 87'	32,501	
15 December 2007	Walsall	Away	1–1	Thompson 90'	10,102	
22 December 2007	Bristol Rovers	Home	1–0	Howson 84'	27,863	
26 December 2007	Hartlepool United	Away	1–1	Beckford 90'	7,784	
29 December 2007	Swansea City	Away	2–3	Beckford 12', Thompson 46'	19,010	
1 January 2008	Oldham Athletic	Home	1–3	Constantine 46'	25,906	
5 January 2008	Northampton Town	Home	3–0	Richardson 43', Marques 52', Weston 90'	24,472	
14 January 2008	Crewe Alexandra	Away	1–0	Beckford 36'	6,771	
19 January 2008	Doncaster Rovers	Home	0–1	—	31,402	
26 January 2008	Luton Town	Away	1–1	Huntington 27'	9,297	
29 January 2008	Southend United	Away	0–1	—	9,819	
2 February 2008	Tranmere Rovers	Home	0–2	—	24,907	
9 February 2008	Northampton Town	Away	1–1	Howson 38'	7,260	
12 February 2008	Nottingham Forest	Home	1–1	Beckford 83' pen.	29,552	
23 February 2008	Crewe Alexandra	Home	1–1	Kandol 86'	21,223	
1 March 2008	Swindon Town	Away	1–0	Kandol 25'	13,270	
8 March 2008	Bournemouth	Home	2–0	Johnson 11', Kilkenny 63'	21,199	
11 March 2008	Cheltenham Town	Home	1–2	Elding 85'	20,257	
15 March 2008	Port Vale	Away	3–3	Marques 39', Freedman 41', 86'	7,908	
22 March 2008	Walsall	Home	2–0	Beckford 29', 80'	19,095	
29 March 2008	Brighton & Hove Albion	Home	0–0	—	22,575	
1 April 2008	Doncaster Rovers	Away	1–0	Sheehan 20'	15,001	
5 April 2008	Leyton Orient	Away	2–0	Johnson 16', Beckford 50'	7,602	
12 April 2008	Carlisle United	Home	3–2	Freedman 50', 69', Howson 59'	28,530	
15 April 2008	Huddersfield Town	Away	0–1	—	16,413	
19 April 2008	Millwall	Away	2–0	Prutton 70', Hughes 78'	13,395	
25 April 2008	Yeovil Town	Away	1–0	Freedman 4'	9,527	
3 May 2008	Gillingham	Home	2–1	Johnson 69', Kandol 88'	38,256	

==== Play-offs ====
Round	Date	Opponent	Venue	Result F–A	Scorers	Attendance	Ref.
Semi-Final First Leg	12 May 2008	Carlisle United	Home	1–2	Freedman 90'	36,297	
Semi-Final Second Leg	15 May 2008	Carlisle United	Away	2–0	Howson 10', 90'	12,873	
Final	25 May 2008	Doncaster Rovers	Neutral	0–1	—	75,132	

=== FA Cup ===
Round	Date	Opponent	Venue	Result F–A	Scorers	Attendance	Ref.
First Round	9 November 2007	Hereford United	Away	0–0	—	5,924	
First Round Replay	20 November 2007	Hereford United	Home	0–1	—	11,315	

=== League Cup ===
Round	Date	Opponent	Venue	Result F–A	Scorers	Attendance	Ref.
First Round	14 August 2007	Macclesfield Town	Away	1–0	Westlake 78'	3,422	
Second Round	28 August 2007	Portsmouth	Away	0–3	—	8,502	

=== League Trophy ===
Round	Date	Opponent	Venue	Result F–A	Scorers	Attendance	Ref.
Second Round	9 October 2007	Darlington	Away	1–0	Huntington 48'	7,891	
Area Quarter-Final	13 November 2007	Bury	Home	1–2	Constantine 8'	18,809	

== Statistics ==
No.	Pos.	Name	League		Play-offs		FA Cup		League Cup		League Trophy		Total		Discipline	
No.	Pos.	Name	Apps	Goals	Apps	Goals	Apps	Goals	Apps	Goals	Apps	Goals	Apps	Goals	Yellow card	Red card
1	GK	(Denmark) Casper Ankergren	43	0	3	0	2	0	2	0	1	0	50	0	2	0
2	DF	(England) Frazer Richardson	39	1	3	0	1	0	1	0	1	0	45	1	0	0
3	DF	(England) Paul Huntington	12+5	2	3	0	2	0	0	0	2	1	19+5	3	3	0
3	MF	(United States) Eddie Lewis	1	0	0	0	0	0	1	0	0	0	2	0	0	0
4	MF	(Republic of Ireland) Jonathan Douglas	22+2	3	3	0	1	0	2	0	0+1	0	28+3	3	8	1
5	DF	(Angola) Rui Marques	34+2	3	0	0	1	0	1	0	1	0	37+2	3	5	0
6	DF	(England) Matt Heath	25+1	1	0	0	0	0	2	0	1	1	30+2	1	5	0
7	MF	(England) David Prutton	38+5	4	3	0	0	0	2	0	1	0	44+5	4	9	0
8	MF	(England) Alan Thompson	9+4	3	0	0	0	0	0	0	1	0	10+4	3	5	0
9	FW	(England) Jermaine Beckford	40	20	3	0	2	0	0+2	0	0	0	45+2	20	7	1
10	FW	(England) Leon Constantine	1+3	1	0	0	0+2	0	0	0	1	1	2+5	2	0	0
11	FW	(England) Ian Westlake	10+10	1	0	0	1	0	0+1	1	1	0	12+11	2	3	0
14	MF	(England) Jonny Howson	21+5	3	3	2	2	0	2	0	2	0	30+5	5	3	0
16	MF	(England) Wayne Andrews	1	0	0	0	0	0	0	0	1	0	2	0	1	0
16	MF	(England) Bradley Johnson	18+3	2	3	0	0	0	0	0	0	0	21+3	2	1	0
17	FW	(France) Sébastien Carole	17+11	3	0+1	0	2	0	2	0	1	0	22+12	3	2	0
18	MF	(Republic of Ireland) Robert Bayly	0	0	0	0	0	0	0+1	0	0	0	0+1	0	0	0
19	FW	(Norway) Tore André Flo	4+18	3	0	0	0	0	0	0	0	0	4+18	3	0	0
20	FW	(Democratic Republic of the Congo) Trésor Kandol	32+9	11	0+2	0	2	0	2	0	0+1	0	36+12	11	6	1
22	MF	(England) Andrew Hughes	32+8	1	0+2	0	1	0	0	0	0	0	33+10	1	11	0
23	MF	(England) Curtis Weston	1+6	1	0	0	1	1	0+1	0	1	0	3+8	1	0	0
24	DF	(England) Jamie Clapham	12+1	0	0	0	0+1	0	0	0	0+1	0	12+3	0	1	0
24	MF	(Scotland) Peter Sweeney	6+3	0	0	0	0	0	0	0	0	0	6+3	0	1	0
25	GK	(England) David Lucas	3	0	0	0	0+1	0	0	0	2	0	5+1	0	0	0
26	DF	(England) Ben Parker	6+3	0	0	0	2	0	2	0	2	0	12+3	1	0	0
27	DF	(England) Scott Gardner	1	0	0	0	0	0	1	0	0	0	2	0	0	0
28	MF	(England) Fabian Delph	0+1	0	0	0	0	0	0+1	0	0	0	0+2	0	0	0
29	FW	(England) Tom Elliott	0	0	0	0	0	0	1	0	0	0	1	0	0	0
30	MF	(Portugal) Filipe da Costa	0+4	0	0	0	0+1	0	0	0	1+1	0	1+6	0	0	1
31	FW	(England) Tomi Ameobi	0	0	0	0	0	0	1	0	0+1	0	1+1	0	0	0
32	FW	(Netherlands) Mark de Vries	1+5	1	0	0	0	0	0	0	2	0	3+5	1	1	0
32	DF	(Republic of Ireland) Alan Sheehan	10	1	0	0	0	0	0	0	0	0	10	1	2	1
33	DF	(Bulgaria) Radostin Kishishev	5+2	0	0	0	0	0	0	0	0	0	5+2	0	1	0
33	DF	(Slovakia) Ľubomír Michalík	17	0	3	0	0	0	0	0	0	0	20	0	1	0
34	DF	(Republic of Ireland) Simon Madden	0	0	0	0	0	0	0	0	1	0	1	0	0	0
35	DF	(England) Darren Kenton	16	0	0	0	0	0	0	0	0	0	16	0	3	0
37	MF	(Australia) Neil Kilkenny	16	1	3	0	0	0	0	0	0	0	19	1	3	0
38	FW	(Scotland) Dougie Freedman	9+2	5	3	1	0	0	0	0	0	0	12+2	6	0	0
39	FW	(England) Anthony Elding	4+5	1	0	0	0	0	0	0	0	0	4+5	1	0	0

== Transfers ==
=== In ===
Date	Pos.	Name	From	Fee	Ref.
7 August 2007	GK	(Denmark) Casper Ankergren	(Denmark) Brøndby	Undisclosed	
7 August 2007	FW	(England) Leon Constantine	(England) Port Vale	Free	
7 August 2007	DF	(England) Matt Heath	(England) Coventry City	Free	
7 August 2007	MF	(England) David Prutton	(England) Southampton	Free	
7 August 2007	MF	(England) Curtis Weston	(England) Swindon Town	Free	
9 August 2007	MF	(England) Alan Thompson	(Scotland) Celtic	Free	
10 August 2007	MF	(England) Andrew Hughes	(England) Norwich City	Undisclosed	
1 September 2007	GK	(Scotland) Alan Martin	(Scotland) Motherwell	Undisclosed	
1 September 2007	DF	(England) Paul Huntington	(England) Newcastle United	£150,000	
1 September 2007	MF	(Portugal) Filipe da Costa	(Greece) Ionikos	Free	
11 September 2007	GK	(England) David Lucas	(England) Barnsley	Free	
2 January 2008	MF	(Finland) Sebastian Sorsa	(Finland) HJK Helsinki	Free	
7 January 2008	MF	(Australia) Neil Kilkenny	(England) Birmingham City	£150,000	
8 January 2008	MF	(England) Bradley Johnson	(England) Northampton Town	£250,000	
10 January 2008	MF	(Scotland) Peter Sweeney	(England) Stoke City	£150,000	
31 January 2008	FW	(England) Anthony Elding	(England) Stockport County	£100,000	
31 January 2008	DF	(England) Darren Kenton	(England) Leicester City	Free	
31 January 2008	DF	(Slovakia) Ľubomír Michalík	(England) Bolton Wanderers	£200,000	

=== Out ===
Date	Pos.	Name	To	Fee	Ref.
30 June 2007	DF	(Scotland) Stephen Crainey	(England) Blackpool	Free	
30 June 2007	DF	(England) Robbie Elliott	(England) Hartlepool United	Free	
30 June 2007	DF	(Australia) Hayden Foxe	(Australia) Perth Glory	Free	
30 June 2007	DF	(England) Sam Hird	(England) Doncaster Rovers	Free	
30 June 2007	DF	(Republic of Ireland) Gary Kelly	Retired		
30 June 2007	FW	(England) Ian Thomas-Moore	(England) Hartlepool United	Free	
30 June 2007	GK	(Scotland) Neil Sullivan	(England) Doncaster Rovers	Free	
5 July 2007	MF	(England) Kevin Nicholls	(England) Preston North End	Undisclosed	
13 July 2007	FW	(Northern Ireland) David Healy	(England) Fulham	£1,500,000	
13 July 2007	FW	(England) Robbie Blake	(England) Burnley	£250,000	
25 July 2007	MF	(England) Danny Rose	(England) Tottenham Hotspur	£1,000,000	
2 August 2007	FW	(England) Richard Cresswell	(England) Stoke City	£500,000	
20 August 2007	MF	(United States) Eddie Lewis	(England) Derby County	Undisclosed	
1 September 2007	MF	(Iceland) Gylfi Einarsson	Released		
22 January 2008	MF	(England) Shaun Derry	(England) Crystal Palace	Undisclosed	
12 March 2008	FW	(Norway) Tore André Flo	Retired		
11 April 2008	MF	(England) Gavin Rothery	Released		
11 April 2008	DF	(Republic of Ireland) Simon Madden	Released		
22 May 2008	MF	(Portugal) Filipe da Costa	Released		
13 May 2008	DF	(England) Matt Heath	(England) Colchester United	Free	

=== Loan in ===
Date from	Date to	Pos.	Name	From	Ref.
20 August 2007	20 November 2007	DF	(England) Jamie Clapham	(England) Wolverhampton Wanderers	
1 October 2007	27 October 2007	FW	(England) Wayne Andrews	(England) Coventry City	
1 October 2007	15 January 2008	FW	(Netherlands) Mark de Vries	(England) Leicester City	
23 October 2007	23 January 2008	DF	(Bulgaria) Radostin Kishishev	(England) Leicester City	
4 January 2008	7 January 2008	MF	(Australia) Neil Kilkenny	(England) Birmingham City	
10 January 2008	31 January 2008	DF	(England) Darren Kenton	(England) Leicester City	
31 January 2008	25 May 2008	DF	(Republic of Ireland) Alan Sheehan	(England) Leicester City	
28 February 2008	4 March 2008	DF	(Republic of Ireland) Stephen O'Halloran	(England) Aston Villa	
6 March 2008	25 May 2008	FW	(Scotland) Dougie Freedman	(England) Crystal Palace	

=== Loan out ===
Date from	Date to	Pos.	Name	To	Ref.
15 November 2007	4 May 2008	FW	(England) Tomi Ameobi	(England) Scunthorpe United	
19 November 2007	19 January 2008	MF	(England) Shaun Derry	(England) Crystal Palace	
22 January 2008	22 February 2008	MF	(England) Alan Thompson	(England) Hartlepool United	
22 January 2008	24 February 2008	DF	(England) Scott Gardner	(England) Farsley Celtic	
26 February 2008	17 May 2008	DF	(England) Ben Parker	(England) Darlington	
4 March 2008	4 May 2008	MF	(England) Ian Westlake	(England) Brighton & Hove Albion	
4 March 2008	4 May 2008	MF	(England) Curtis Weston	(England) Scunthorpe United	
5 March 2008	7 April 2008	FW	(England) Leon Constantine	(England) Oldham Athletic	
14 March 2008	4 May 2008	DF	(England) Matt Heath	(England) Colchester United	
