= 2006–07 Leeds United A.F.C. season =

2006–07 season of Leeds United

Leeds United
2006–07 season
- Chairman: Ken Bates
- Manager: Kevin Blackwell (until 20 September); John Carver (until 23 October); David Geddis (caretaker, until 24 Oct); Dennis Wise (from 24 October)
- Stadium: Elland Road
- Championship: 24th (relegated)
- FA Cup: Third round
- League Cup: Third round
- Top goalscorer: League: David Healy (10); All: David Healy (10)
- Highest home attendance: 31,269 vs Ipswich Town (28 April 2007, Championship)
- Lowest home attendance: 7,220 vs Barnet (19 September 2006, League Cup)
- Average home league attendance: 21,613

The 2006–07 season saw Leeds United competing in the Championship (known as the Coca-Cola Championship for sponsorship reasons) for a third successive season.

== Competitions ==
=== Championship ===
==== League table ====
| Pos | Team | Pld | W | D | L | GF | GA | GD | Pts | Promotion, qualification or relegation |
|---|---|---|---|---|---|---|---|---|---|---|
| 20 | Barnsley | 46 | 15 | 5 | 26 | 53 | 85 | −32 | 50 | |
| 21 | Hull City | 46 | 13 | 10 | 23 | 51 | 67 | −16 | 49 | |
| 22 | Southend United (R) | 46 | 10 | 12 | 24 | 47 | 80 | −33 | 42 | Relegation to Football League One |
| 23 | Luton Town (R) | 46 | 10 | 10 | 26 | 53 | 81 | −28 | 40 | Relegation to Football League One |
| 24 | Leeds United (R) | 46 | 13 | 7 | 26 | 46 | 72 | −26 | 36 (Note: Leeds United had 10 points deducted for entering financial administration.) | Relegation to Football League One |

Source: RSSSF
Rules for classification: In the Football League goals scored (F) takes precedence over goal difference (GD).
(R) Relegated

==== Results summary ====
| Overall | | | | | | | | Home | | | | | | Away | | | | | |
| Pld | W | D | L | GF | GA | GD | Pts | W | D | L | GF | GA | GD | W | D | L | GF | GA | GD |
|---|---|---|---|---|---|---|---|---|---|---|---|---|---|---|---|---|---|---|---|
| 46 | 13 | 7 | 26 | 46 | 72 | −26 | 46 | 10 | 4 | 9 | 27 | 30 | −3 | 3 | 3 | 17 | 19 | 42 | −23 |

Source: Statto

==== Results by round ====
| Round | 1 | 2 | 3 | 4 | 5 | 6 | 7 | 8 | 9 | 10 | 11 | 12 | 13 | 14 | 15 | 16 | 17 | 18 | 19 | 20 | 21 | 22 | 23 | 24 | 25 | 26 | 27 | 28 | 29 | 30 | 31 | 32 | 33 | 34 | 35 | 36 | 37 | 38 | 39 | 40 | 41 | 42 | 43 | 44 | 45 | 46 |
|---|---|---|---|---|---|---|---|---|---|---|---|---|---|---|---|---|---|---|---|---|---|---|---|---|---|---|---|---|---|---|---|---|---|---|---|---|---|---|---|---|---|---|---|---|---|---|
| Ground | H | A | A | H | A | H | H | A | H | A | H | H | A | H | A | A | H | H | A | A | H | H | A | H | A | A | H | H | A | A | H | A | H | A | A | H | H | A | A | H | H | A | H | A | H | A |
| Result | W | D | L | L | W | L | L | L | W | L | L | L | L | W | L | L | W | L | W | L | D | L | L | D | L | L | W | L | W | L | W | L | D | L | L | L | W | D | D | W | W | L | W | L | D | L |
| Position | 7 | 5 | 13 | 18 | 11 | 16 | 22 | 23 | 18 | 20 | 22 | 23 | 23 | 21 | 21 | 23 | 22 | 22 | 21 | 22 | 22 | 22 | 23 | 23 | 23 | 23 | 23 | 23 | 24 | 24 | 24 | 24 | 24 | 24 | 24 | 24 | 24 | 24 | 24 | 23 | 21 | 22 | 22 | 22 | 22 | 24 |

Source: Statto.com
A = Away; H = Home; W = Win; D = Draw; L = Loss

=== Championship ===
| Date | Opponent | Venue | Result F–A | Scorers | Attendance | Ref. |
|---|---|---|---|---|---|---|
| 5 August 2006 | Norwich City | Home | 1–0 | Healy 41' pen. | 22,417 | |
| 8 August 2006 | Queens Park Rangers | Away | 2–2 | Lewis 65', Horsfield 82' | 13,996 | |
| 13 August 2006 | Crystal Palace | Away | 0–1 | | 17,218 | |
| 19 August 2006 | Cardiff City | Home | 0–1 | | 18,246 | |
| 27 August 2006 | Sheffield Wednesday | Away | 1–0 | Healy 70' pen. | 23,792 | |
| 10 September 2006 | Wolverhampton Wanderers | Home | 0–1 | | 16,268 | |
| 13 September 2006 | Sunderland | Home | 0–3 | | 23,037 | |
| 16 September 2006 | Coventry City | Away | 0–1 | | 22,146 | |
| 23 September 2006 | Birmingham City | Home | 3–2 | Healy 6', 15' pen., Tébily 85' o.g. | 18,898 | |
| 30 September 2006 | West Bromwich Albion | Away | 2–4 | Horsfield 82', Stone 88' | 21,435 | |
| 14 October 2006 | Stoke City | Home | 0–4 | | 18,173 | |
| 17 October 2006 | Leicester City | Home | 1–2 | Butler 87' | 16,477 | |
| 21 October 2006 | Luton Town | Away | 1–5 | Foxe 17' | 10,260 | |
| 28 October 2006 | Southend United | Home | 2–0 | Thomas-Moore 40', Blake 88' | 19,528 | |
| 31 October 2006 | Preston North End | Away | 1–4 | Healy 80' | 16,168 | |
| 4 November 2006 | Barnsley | Away | 2–3 | Derry 44', Blake 45' | 16,943 | |
| 11 November 2006 | Colchester United | Home | 3–0 | Blake 36', 53' pen., Cresswell 48' | 17,678 | |
| 18 November 2006 | Southampton | Home | 0–3 | | 19,647 | |
| 25 November 2006 | Plymouth Argyle | Away | 2–1 | Blake 3', Lewis 61' | 17,088 | |
| 28 November 2006 | Burnley | Away | 1–2 | Healy 87' | 15,061 | |
| 2 December 2006 | Barnsley | Home | 2–2 | Kandol 8', Ehiogu 45' | 21,378 | |
| 9 December 2006 | Derby County | Home | 0–1 | | 20,087 | |
| 16 December 2006 | Ipswich Town | Away | 0–1 | | 23,661 | |
| 23 December 2006 | Hull City | Home | 0–0 | | 22,578 | |
| 26 December 2006 | Sunderland | Away | 0–2 | | 40,116 | |
| 30 December 2006 | Stoke City | Away | 1–3 | Thomas-Moore 41' | 18,128 | |
| 1 January 2007 | Coventry City | Home | 2–1 | Healy 15', Douglas 53' | 18,158 | |
| 20 January 2007 | West Bromwich Albion | Home | 2–3 | Flo 3', Thompson 66' | 20,019 | |
| 30 January 2007 | Hull City | Away | 2–1 | Heath 21', Thompson 50' | 24,311 | |
| 3 February 2007 | Norwich City | Away | 1–2 | Howson 20' | 25,018 | |
| 10 February 2007 | Crystal Palace | Home | 2–1 | Heath 27', Blake 72' | 19,228 | |
| 17 February 2007 | Cardiff City | Away | 0–1 | | 16,644 | |
| 20 February 2007 | Queens Park Rangers | Home | 0–0 | | 29,593 | |
| 24 February 2007 | Wolverhampton Wanderers | Away | 0–1 | | 24,314 | |
| 27 February 2007 | Birmingham City | Away | 0–1 | | 18,363 | |
| 3 March 2007 | Sheffield Wednesday | Home | 2–3 | Bullen 88' o.g., Cresswell 89' | 25,297 | |
| 10 March 2007 | Luton Town | Home | 1–0 | Cresswell 50' | 27,138 | |
| 13 March 2007 | Leicester City | Away | 1–1 | Blake 45' | 25,165 | |
| 17 March 2007 | Southend United | Away | 1–1 | Healy 88' | 11,274 | |
| 31 March 2007 | Preston North End | Home | 2–1 | Blake 51', Healy 90' | 18,433 | |
| 7 April 2007 | Plymouth Argyle | Home | 2–1 | Healy 45', Michalík 87' | 30,034 | |
| 9 April 2007 | Colchester United | Away | 1–2 | Lewis 53' | 5,916 | |
| 14 April 2007 | Burnley | Home | 1–0 | Heath 21' | 23,528 | |
| 21 April 2007 | Southampton | Away | 0–1 | | 29,012 | |
| 28 April 2007 | Ipswich Town | Home | 1–1 | Cresswell 12' | 31,269 | |
| 6 May 2007 | Derby County | Away | 0–2 | | 31,183 | |

=== FA Cup ===
| Round | Date | Opponent | Venue | Result F–A | Scorers | Attendance | Ref. |
|---|---|---|---|---|---|---|---|
| Third Round | 6 January 2007 | West Bromwich Albion | Away | 1–3 | Robinson 90' o.g. | 16,957 | |

=== League Cup ===
| Round | Date | Opponent | Venue | Result F–A | Scorers | Attendance | Ref. |
|---|---|---|---|---|---|---|---|
| First Round | 22 August 2006 | Chester City | Home | 1–0 | Bakke 57' | 10,013 | |
| Second Round | 19 September 2006 | Barnet | Home | 3–1 | Blake 7', Thomas-Moore 55', 74' | 7,220 | |
| Third Round | 24 October 2006 | Southend United | Home | 1–3 | Thomas-Moore 44' | 10,449 | |

== Statistics ==
| No. | Pos. | Name | League | | FA Cup | | League Cup | | Total | | Discipline | |
| No. | Pos. | Name | Apps | Goals | Apps | Goals | Apps | Goals | Apps | Goals | Yellow card | Red card |
|---|---|---|---|---|---|---|---|---|---|---|---|---|
| 1 | GK | (Scotland) Neil Sullivan | 7 | 0 | 1 | 0 | 2 | 0 | 10 | 0 | 0 | 0 |
| 2 | DF | (Republic of Ireland) Gary Kelly | 16 | 0 | 0 | 0 | 2 | 0 | 18 | 0 | 2 | 0 |
| 3 | DF | (Scotland) Stephen Crainey | 18+1 | 0 | 0 | 0 | 3 | 0 | 21+1 | 0 | 3 | 0 |
| 4 | MF | (Republic of Ireland) Jonathan Douglas | 34+1 | 1 | 0 | 0 | 2 | 0 | 36+1 | 1 | 15 | 1 |
| 5 | DF | (England) Ugo Ehiogu | 6 | 1 | 0 | 0 | 0 | 0 | 6 | 1 | 0 | 0 |
| 5 | DF | (Bulgaria) Radostin Kishishev | 10 | 0 | 0 | 0 | 0 | 0 | 10 | 0 | 1 | 0 |
| 5 | DF | (England) Alan Wright | 1 | 0 | 0 | 0 | 0 | 0 | 1 | 0 | 0 | 0 |
| 6 | DF | (Republic of Ireland) Paul Butler | 16 | 1 | 0 | 0 | 1 | 0 | 17 | 1 | 4 | 0 |
| 6 | MF | (England) Alan Thompson | 9+2 | 2 | 0 | 0 | 0 | 0 | 9+2 | 2 | 3 | 0 |
| 7 | MF | (England) Ian Westlake | 19+8 | 0 | 0 | 0 | 2 | 0 | 21+8 | 0 | 6 | 0 |
| 8 | FW | (Norway) Tore André Flo | 1 | 1 | 0+1 | 0 | 0 | 0 | 1 | 1+1 | 0 | 0 |
| 8 | MF | (England) Sean Gregan | 1 | 0 | 0 | 0 | 1 | 0 | 2 | 0 | 1 | 0 |
| 9 | FW | (Northern Ireland) David Healy | 31+10 | 10 | 1 | 0 | 1+1 | 0 | 33+11 | 10 | 8 | 0 |
| 10 | FW | (England) Michael Gray | 6 | 0 | 0 | 0 | 0 | 0 | 6 | 0 | 1 | 0 |
| 10 | FW | (England) Geoff Horsfield | 11+3 | 2 | 0 | 0 | 1 | 0 | 12+3 | 2 | 0 | 1 |
| 11 | MF | (United States) Eddie Lewis | 40+1 | 3 | 1 | 0 | 3 | 0 | 44+1 | 3 | 3 | 0 |
| 12 | DF | (England) Robbie Elliott | 5+2 | 0 | 1 | 0 | 0 | 0 | 6+2 | 0 | 4 | 0 |
| 12 | MF | (England) Adam Johnson | 4+1 | 0 | 0 | 0 | 0 | 0 | 4+1 | 0 | 0 | 0 |
| 13 | FW | (United States) Jemal Johnson | 3+2 | 0 | 0 | 0 | 0 | 0 | 3+2 | 0 | 1 | 0 |
| 14 | MF | (England) Steve Stone | 5+5 | 1 | 0 | 0 | 1 | 0 | 6+5 | 1 | 0 | 0 |
| 15 | DF | (England) Frazer Richardson | 19+3 | 0 | 0 | 0 | 2 | 0 | 21+3 | 0 | 0 | 0 |
| 16 | MF | (Iceland) Gylfi Einarsson | 0+3 | 0 | 0 | 0 | 0 | 0 | 0+3 | 0 | 0 | 0 |
| 17 | FW | (France) Sébastien Carole | 7+10 | 0 | 0 | 0 | 1 | 0 | 8+10 | 0 | 0 | 0 |
| 18 | MF | (England) Kevin Nicholls | 12+1 | 0 | 1 | 0 | 1 | 0 | 14+1 | 0 | 4 | 1 |
| 19 | MF | (Norway) Eirik Bakke | 2+1 | 0 | 0 | 0 | 1 | 1 | 3+1 | 1 | 1 | 0 |
| 19 | DF | (England) Matthew Heath | 26 | 3 | 1 | 0 | 0 | 0 | 27 | 3 | 1 | 0 |
| 20 | DF | (Australia) Hayden Foxe | 12+6 | 1 | 1 | 0 | 2 | 0 | 15+6 | 1 | 8 | 1 |
| 21 | MF | (England) Shaun Derry | 23 | 1 | 0+1 | 0 | 0+1 | 0 | 23+2 | 1 | 8 | 0 |
| 22 | FW | (England) Ian Thomas-Moore | 14+19 | 2 | 1 | 0 | 1+2 | 3 | 16+21 | 5 | 2 | 0 |
| 23 | GK | (Republic of Ireland) Graham Stack | 12 | 0 | 0 | 0 | 0 | 0 | 12 | 0 | 1 | 0 |
| 24 | DF | (Angola) Rui Marques | 14+3 | 0 | 1 | 0 | 0 | 0 | 15+3 | 0 | 2 | 0 |
| 25 | FW | (England) Richard Cresswell | 18+4 | 4 | 0 | 0 | 0+1 | 0 | 18+5 | 4 | 5 | 0 |
| 26 | DF | (England) Matthew Kilgallon | 18+1 | 0 | 0 | 0 | 2+1 | 0 | 20+2 | 0 | 4 | 1 |
| 26 | DF | (Slovenia) Ľubomír Michalík | 7 | 1 | 0 | 0 | 0 | 0 | 7 | 1 | 3 | 0 |
| 27 | FW | (Democratic Republic of the Congo) Trésor Kandol | 11+7 | 1 | 0 | 0 | 0 | 0 | 11+7 | 1 | 5 | 0 |
| 28 | FW | (England) Robbie Blake | 27+9 | 8 | 1 | 0 | 2+1 | 1 | 30+10 | 9 | 4 | 0 |
| 31 | DF | (Mozambique) Armando Sá | 6+5 | 0 | 0+1 | 0 | 0 | 0 | 6+6 | 0 | 1 | 0 |
| 31 | GK | (Trinidad and Tobago) Tony Warner | 13 | 0 | 0 | 0 | 1 | 0 | 14 | 0 | 1 | 0 |
| 32 | FW | (England) Jermaine Beckford | 1+4 | 0 | 0 | 0 | 1 | 0 | 2+4 | 0 | 1 | 0 |
| 33 | MF | (England) Jonny Howson | 6+3 | 1 | 1 | 0 | 0+1 | 0 | 7+4 | 1 | 1 | 0 |
| 34 | MF | (Republic of Ireland) Robert Bayly | 1 | 0 | 0 | 0 | 0+1 | 0 | 1+1 | 0 | 0 | 1 |
| 37 | FW | (England) Tom Elliott | 0+3 | 0 | 0 | 0 | 0 | 0 | 0+3 | 0 | 0 | 0 |
| 39 | MF | (England) Fabian Delph | 0+1 | 0 | 0 | 0 | 0 | 0 | 0+1 | 0 | 0 | 0 |
| 40 | GK | (Denmark) Casper Ankergren | 14 | 0 | 0 | 0 | 0 | 0 | 14 | 0 | 1 | 0 |

== Transfers ==
=== In ===
| Date | Pos. | Name | From | Fee | Ref. |
|---|---|---|---|---|---|
| 5 July 2006 | FW | (France) Sébastien Carole | (England) Brighton & Hove Albion | Free | |
| 21 July 2006 | MF | (England) David Livermore | (England) Millwall | Undisclosed | |
| 26 July 2006 | MF | (England) Kevin Nicholls | (England) Luton Town | £700,000 | |
| 11 August 2006 | DF | (Australia) Hayden Foxe | Unattached | Free | |
| 31 August 2006 | MF | (Republic of Ireland) Jonathan Douglas | (England) Blackburn Rovers | Undisclosed | |
| 1 January 2007 | DF | (England) Robbie Elliott | (England) Sunderland | Free | |
| 1 January 2007 | DF | (England) Matt Heath | (England) Coventry City | Free | |
| 3 January 2007 | FW | (Norway) Tore André Flo | (Norway) Vålerenga | Free | |
| 4 January 2007 | FW | (Democratic Republic of the Congo) Trésor Kandol | (England) Barnet | £200,000 | |

=== Out ===
| Date | Pos. | Name | To | Fee | Ref. |
|---|---|---|---|---|---|
| 26 June 2006 | MF | (England) Danny Pugh | (England) Preston North End | £250,000 | |
| 6 June 2006 | MF | (England) Jermaine Wright | (England) Southampton | Released | |
| 3 July 2006 | FW | (England) Michael Ricketts | (England) Southend United | Free | |
| 7 July 2006 | MF | (England) Simon Walton | (England) Charlton Athletic | £500,000 | |
| 26 July 2006 | GK | (England) Ian Bennett | (England) Sheffield United | Undisclosed | |
| 30 August 2006 | MF | (Republic of Ireland) Ian Morris | (England) Scunthorpe United | Undisclosed | |
| 31 August 2006 | MF | (Norway) Eirik Bakke | (Norway) SK Brann | Free | |
| 15 December 2006 | MF | (England) Steve Stone | Retired | | |
| 2 January 2007 | DF | (Republic of Ireland) Paul Butler | (England) Milton Keynes Dons | Released | |
| 5 January 2007 | MF | (England) Sean Gregan | (England) Oldham Athletic | Released | |
| 8 January 2007 | DF | (England) Matthew Kilgallon | (England) Sheffield United | £1,750,000 | |

=== Loan in ===
| Date from | Date to | Pos. | Name | From | Ref. |
|---|---|---|---|---|---|
| 3 August 2006 | 2 January 2007 | FW | (England) Geoff Horsfield | (England) Sheffield United | |
| 4 August 2006 | 1 January 2007 | GK | (England) Tony Warner | (England) Fulham | |
| 10 October 2006 | 10 November 2006 | DF | (England) Alan Wright | (England) Sheffield United | |
| 16 October 2006 | 18 November 2006 | MF | (England) Adam Johnson | (England) Middlesbrough | |
| 27 October 2006 | 30 June 2007 | GK | (England) Graham Stack | (England) Reading | |
| 9 November 2006 | 1 January 2007 | DF | (England) Matt Heath | (England) Coventry City | |
| 23 November 2006 | 1 January 2007 | FW | (Democratic Republic of the Congo) Trésor Kandol | (England) Barnet | |
| 23 November 2006 | 1 January 2007 | DF | (England) Ugo Ehiogu | (England) Middlesbrough | |
| 12 January 2007 | 30 June 2007 | MF | (England) Alan Thompson | (Scotland) Celtic | |
| 31 January 2007 | 30 June 2007 | GK | (Denmark) Casper Ankergren | (Denmark) Brøndby IF | |
| 19 February 2007 | 30 June 2007 | FW | (United States) Jemal Johnson | (England) Wolverhampton Wanderers | |
| 2 March 2007 | 30 June 2007 | DF | (Bulgaria) Radostin Kishishev | (England) Charlton Athletic | |
| 9 March 2007 | 19 April 2007 | DF | (Slovakia) Ľubomír Michalík | (England) Bolton Wanderers | |
| 22 March 2007 | 30 June 2007 | DF | (England) Michael Gray | (England) Blackburn Rovers | |

=== Loan out ===
| Date from | Date to | Pos. | Name | To | Ref. |
|---|---|---|---|---|---|
| 28 July 2006 | 1 January 2007 | DF | (England) Ben Parker | (England) Bradford City | |
| 5 October 2006 | 5 November 2006 | FW | (England) Jermaine Beckford | (England) Carlisle United | |
| 8 November 2006 | 1 January 2007 | MF | (England) Sean Gregan | (England) Oldham Athletic | |
| 22 November 2006 | 2 January 2007 | DF | (Republic of Ireland) Paul Butler | (England) Milton Keynes Dons | |
| 23 November 2006 | 21 December 2006 | GK | (Scotland) Neil Sullivan | (England) Doncaster Rovers | |
| 19 January 2007 | 30 June 2007 | FW | (England) Jermaine Beckford | (England) Scunthorpe United | |
| 9 February 2007 | 9 May 2007 | MF | (England) Sam Hird | (England) Doncaster Rovers | |
| 19 February 2007 | 24 April 2007 | GK | (Scotland) Neil Sullivan | (England) Doncaster Rovers | |
