= Leigh Bromby =

English footballer

Personal information
- Full name: Leigh David Bromby
- Date of birth: 2 June 1980 (age 46)
- Place of birth: Dewsbury, England
- Height: 6 ft 2 in (1.88 m)
- Position: Defender

Team information
- Current team: Derby County (Talent Acquisition Lead)

Senior career*
Years	Team	Apps	(Gls)
1998–2004	Sheffield Wednesday	100	(2)
1999–2000	→ Mansfield Town (loan)	10	(1)
2003	→ Norwich City (loan)	5	(0)
2004–2008	Sheffield United	109	(6)
2008–2009	Watford	38	(1)
2009	→ Sheffield United (loan)	12	(1)
2009	Sheffield United	0	(0)
2009–2013	Leeds United	55	(1)
Total		329	(12)
- * Club domestic league appearances and goals

Leigh David Bromby (born 2 June 1980) is an English retired footballer who played as a defender.

Bromby primarily played for Sheffield Wednesday and Sheffield United, and is the only player to have played 100 league games for both teams.

After retirement as a player, Bromby stayed in football acting as a coach and head of recruitment, he is currently the Talent Acquisition Lead at Derby County.

== Career ==
=== Sheffield Wednesday ===
Born in Dewsbury, Bromby started his footballing career when he was spotted by Daniel Firth at Whitchapel Middle school before joining Liversedge then being spotted by Sheffield Wednesday. He then progressed through the Sheffield Wednesday youth academy, and in September 1999 joined Mansfield Town on loan for three months. He made his Football League debut on 12 December 1999 in a 0–0 draw at Barnet. He scored his first career goal in a 3–1 home win over Southend United in January 2000.

Bromby made his Wednesday debut the following season; on 23 December 2000 as substitute in a 1–0 home defeat to Wolverhampton Wanderers. He went on to make 20 appearances that season.

He spent part of the 2002–03 season on loan at Norwich City before returning to Wednesday. After making 112 appearances for the club he moved to local rivals Sheffield United in a free transfer on 24 May 2004.

=== Sheffield United ===
Bromby made his début for Sheffield United against Burnley at Turf Moor on 7 August 2004 in a 1–1 draw. He played in all 46 league matches that season and scored his first senior goal for the club in the same game a diving header at the far post.

On 15 August 2006, he signed a new three-year contract with United, with an option for a further year.

Bromby spent much of the 2007–08 season on the sidelines, making only 15 appearances. His longest spell in the side was in January 2008, when he played 6 games in which United lost only once.

=== Watford ===
On 31 January 2008 he moved to Watford, signing a three-and-a-half-year contract, for a fee of £600,000 rising to £850,000 based on appearances. His final appearance for United had been in a league fixture against his new club, two days previously. His former manager, Bryan Robson, admitted that he did not want to sell Bromby, but he had wanted regular football and Watford's offer had been reasonable. On 2 February 2008, Bromby made his debut for Watford at home against Wolverhampton Wanderers. Within the first minute his long throw set up Steve Kabba to score in an eventual 3–0 victory. After only a year at Vicarage Road Bromby returned to Sheffield United on a six-month loan with a view to a permanent deal. He scored once in the league for Watford, in a 1–1 draw with West Bromwich Albion on 11 April 2008.

=== Sheffield United ===
Ironically, having returned to Bramall Lane, just as his first spell at the club ended with an appearance against Watford, his first game back with the Blades also saw him appear as a second-half substitute against The Hornets despite them still being his current employers. Bromby played the remainder of the season as defensive cover, completing thirteen appearances and one goal during his loan period. Following the end of the season he signed a new two-year deal with United, returning to his former club on a free transfer.

=== Leeds United ===
Only a few weeks after re-signing for Sheffield United, and after failing to make a league appearance under manager Kevin Blackwell, Bromby moved to Leeds United for an undisclosed fee at the end of the August 2009 transfer window. As a child Bromby was brought up as a Leeds United fan, so the move helped fulfill a dream of playing for his boyhood heroes.

==== 2009–10 season ====
He made his Leeds debut in the 2–0 league victory over Stockport County. Bromby gave away a penalty in his second start for Leeds, however Leeds goalkeeper Shane Higgs saved Southend United striker Lee Barnard's penalty. Since joining Leeds Bromby has played in the centre back and right back roles. Bromby scored his first goal for Leeds in another match against Stockport County, with a strike in the closing stages to put Leeds 3–2 ahead. Bromby received his 5th booking of the season in the same game against Stockport and missed the next match – an FA Cup 3rd round tie against Manchester United. With Bromby being a Leeds fan, the suspension was especially tough to take. Leeds ended up pulling off a famous victory against Manchester United with Bromby's replacement Jason Crowe putting in a fantastic performance. Crowe's performance earned him a start ahead of Bromby in the following game against Wycombe Wanderers with Bromby having to settle for a place on the bench. With captain Richard Naylor out injured for the FA Cup 4th round match against Tottenham Hotspur, Bromby played at the heart of Leeds' defence and helped Leeds earn a 2–2 draw and a replay against their Premier League opposition. Bromby started Leeds' last game of the season, replacing the injured captain Richard Naylor. Leeds won the game 2–1 and thus sealed promotion to The Championship.

==== 2010–11 season ====
Bromby started the Championship season as Leeds' fourth choice defender, with Naylor, Collins and new signing Alex Bruce ahead of him in the starting lineup. Bromby made his first league appearance of the season on 16 October for Leeds when he came on as a second-half substitute against Middlesbrough. He made only his second appearance of the season on 18 December against Queens Park Rangers when he came on as an early first-half substitute for Alex Bruce in Leeds 2–0 win over the league leaders. Bromby made his third appearance of the season as a substitute against Arsenal on 8 January. Leeds were 1–0 up when Robert Snodgrass scored a second half penalty, Arsenal equalised in the 90th minute when Cesc Fàbregas scored a penalty.

Bromby came on as a second-half substitute against Arsenal after Andy O'Brien came off injured. He then made his first start of the season in the following game against Portsmouth. After several months out of the team, Bromby regained his starting lineup spot on a regular basis displacing Alex Bruce.

==== 2011–12 season ====
Bromby started the first two games of the season for Leeds on the bench against Southampton and Bradford City but he came into the starting lineup for Leeds' first league home game of the season against Middlesbrough. After missing games through injury, Bromby came back into Leeds' starting lineup replacing the suspended Patrick Kisnorbo on 20 September, coming into the side for a League Cup tie against fierce rivals Manchester United. Bromby kept his place for Leeds in a 3–3 draw against Brighton & Hove Albion, during which he conceded a penalty.

After getting a run of games under his former Blades manager Neil Warnock, Bromby picked up a serious injury against Cardiff City on 21 April when he snapped the Patella tendon in his knee cap. Leeds confirmed the injury was very severe and that Bromby would require surgery on the injury, which could rule him out of action for a year.

On 3 May, it was revealed that Bromby had undergone surgery on the ruptured Patella knee tendon, Manager Neil Warnock claimed the injury was 'rare' and refused to put an exact timescale on Bromby's possible return.

At the club's annual 2012/2013 end of season awards, despite missing the whole season through injury, Bromby won the club's Community Award for all his work within the community.

Having missed the whole of the 2012–13 season due to injury, Bromby was released from his playing contract, but would carry on a role as a coach in Leeds' academy.

At the start of the 2013/14 season on 25 July 2013, Bromby announced his retirement as a footballer due to his knee injury, and he officially joined the Leeds academy full-time as the club's Under 16's coach.

== Coaching career ==
Bromby joined the Leeds United coaching set up on 3 April 2013, after taking his coaching badges whilst injured, after the sacking of Neil Warnock, Bromby became a coach of Leeds' Under 18 side to assist Chris Coates who was covering for Richard Naylor.

On 3 May, it was announced that Bromby would join Leeds academy coaching team full-time. On 11 July 2014, Bromby and Under 18's manager Richard Naylor were made redundant by owner Massimo Cellino.

On 4 August 2014, Bromby joined Huddersfield Town as Professional Development Coach. He served a time as Academy Manager and was appointed as the club's new Head of Football Operations at the completion of the 2019/20 season. He left the club on 13 June 2023.

In April 2025, Bromby joined Derby County as the clubs Interim Recruitment Lead for the summer 2025 transfer window. He kept the role after the closure of the summer window. On 19 March 2026, it was that Bromby would have a permanent role at Derby County as the clubs Talent Acquisition Lead.

== Honours ==
Leeds United

- League One runners-up: 2009–10

Sheffield United

- Championship runners-up: 2005–06

=== Personal ===
* Leeds United Contribution To The Community Award: 2009–10, 2012–13

== Career statistics ==
Appearances and goals by club, season and competition
Club	Season	League			FA Cup		League Cup		Other		Total	
Club	Season	Division	Apps	Goals	Apps	Goals	Apps	Goals	Apps	Goals	Apps	Goals
Sheffield Wednesday	1999–2000	Premier League	0	0	0	0	0	0	—		0	0
Sheffield Wednesday	2000–01	First Division	18	0	2	0	0	0	—		20	0
Sheffield Wednesday	2001–02	First Division	26	1	1	0	6	0	—		33	1
Sheffield Wednesday	2002–03	First Division	27	0	1	0	2	0	—		30	0
Sheffield Wednesday	2003–04	Second Division	29	1	3	0	0	0	5 (Note: Appearance(s) in Football League Trophy)	0	37	1
Sheffield Wednesday	Total		100	2	7	0	8	0	5	0	120	2
Mansfield Town (loan)	1999–2000	Third Division	10	1	0	0	0	0	1	0	11	1
Norwich City (loan)	2002–03	First Division	5	0	0	0	0	0	—		5	0
Sheffield United	2004–05	Championship	46	5	5	0	3	0	—		54	5
Sheffield United	2005–06	Championship	35	1	0	0	2	0	—		37	1
Sheffield United	2006–07	Premier League	17	0	1	0	0	0	—		18	0
Sheffield United	2007–08	Championship	11	0	2	0	3	0	—		16	0
Sheffield United	Total		109	6	8	0	8	0	0	0	125	6
Watford	2007–08	Championship	16	1	0	0	0	0	2 (Note: Appearance(s) in Championship play-offs)	0	18	1
Watford	2008–09	Championship	22	0	1	0	5	0	—		28	0
Watford	Total		38	1	1	0	5	0	2	0	44	1
Sheffield United (loan)	2008–09	Championship	12	1	0	0	0	0	1	0	13	1
Leeds United	2009–10	League One	32	1	5	0	0	0	2	0	39	1
Leeds United	2010–11	Championship	13	0	2	0	0	0	—		15	0
Leeds United	2011–12	Championship	10	0	0	0	2	0	—		12	0
Leeds United	Total		55	1	7	0	2	0	2	0	66	1
Career total			329	12	23	0	24	0	12	0	388	12
