= Casper Ankergren =

Danish footballer (born 1979)

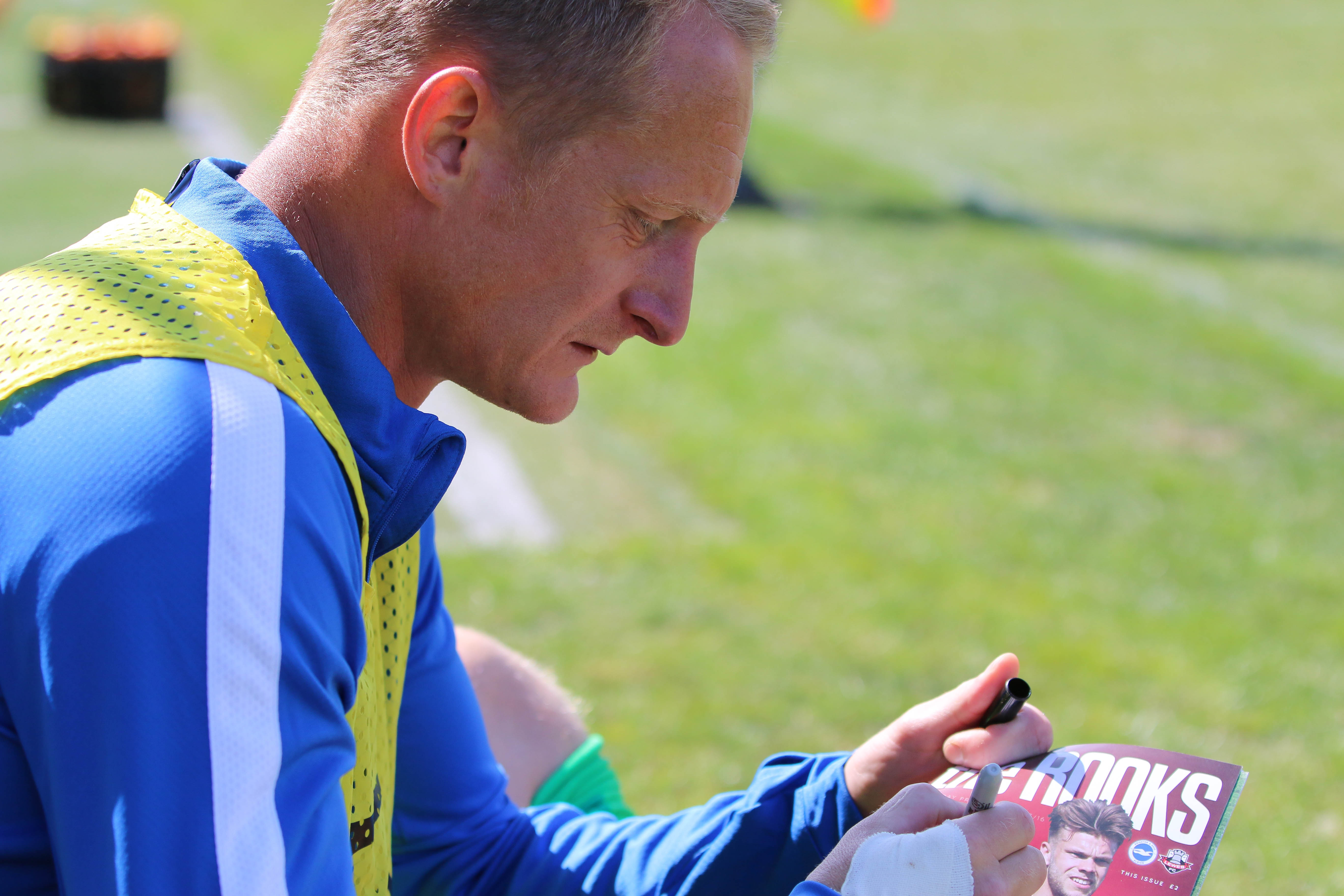
- Ankergren with Brighton & Hove Albion in 2015

Personal information
- Full name: Casper Ankergren
- Date of birth: 9 November 1979 (age 47)
- Place of birth: Køge, Denmark
- Height: 1.94 m (6 ft 4 in)
- Position: Goalkeeper

Team information
- Current team: Panathinaikos (assistant goalkeeper coach)

Youth career
- Solrød

Senior career*
Years	Team	Apps	(Gls)
1998–2000	Køge BK	44	(0)
2001–2007	Brøndby IF	86	(0)
2007	→ Leeds United (loan)	14	(0)
2007–2010	Leeds United	105	(0)
2010–2017	Brighton & Hove Albion	68	(0)
Total		317	(0)

International career
1995	Denmark U17	2	(0)
2000	Denmark U21	3	(0)
- * Club domestic league appearances and goals

Casper Ankergren (Danish pronunciation: [ˈɑŋkɐˌkʁeˀn]; born 9 November 1979) is a Danish professional football coach and former player who played as a goalkeeper. He is currently assistant goalkeeper coach at Greek Superleague club Panathinaikos. Ankergen played three matches for the Denmark national under-21 team.

== Club career ==
=== Køge BK ===
Born in Køge, Sjælland, Ankergren started playing youth football with Solrød FC, before moving on to Køge BK in the Danish 1st Division, and represented Denmark at various youth levels. He made a good display in a pre-season friendly against many-times Danish champions Brøndby IF, and was rumoured to be joining that club in April 2000. He signed a contract with Brøndby in May 2000, initially sending him on loan back at Køge.

=== Brøndby IF ===
Ankergren eventually joined Brøndby IF in the top-flight Danish Superliga championship in January 2001. He made his debut in October 2001, and therefore played only one match as Brøndby won the 2001–02 Superliga title. Ankergren got his breakthrough with Brøndby following the retirement of club legend Mogens Krogh in December 2002. He played all 15 Brøndby matches in the second half of the 2002–03 season, and helped the club win the 2003 Danish Cup.

For the 2003–04 season, Brøndby bought goalkeeper Karim Zaza who became their first choice, leaving Ankergren to spend the season as back-up keeper, playing only one match. At the start of the 2004–05 season, Zaza suffered an injury and Ankergren played the entire season as Brøndby's starting goalkeeper, even after Zaza had recovered. Ankergren finished the season setting a league record 18 clean sheets in 32 matches, and helped Brøndby win the Double of both the 2004–05 Superliga and 2005 Danish Cup titles.

He started the 2005–06 season in the Brøndby goal, but at the winter interval, Zaza was once again selected as first choice keeper. However, Zaza left the club in the summer of 2006 and Ankergren signed a new three-year contract. Brøndby had a disappointing start to the 2006–07 season, sitting in seventh place at the winter break. However, Ankergren was called up to the Denmark national team by national manager Morten Olsen in October 2006, where he served as a back-up goalkeeper for Jesper Christiansen. When Brøndby bought former Danish international goalkeeper Stephan Andersen, Ankergren announced his decision to leave the club.

=== Leeds United ===
In January 2007, Ankergren signed a loan with English club Leeds United. who were battling relegation in the Championship. He signed for the remainder of the 2006–07 Football League season, with an option for Leeds to buy him at a fixed transfer fee at the end of the season. Ankergren established himself as a firm favourite with the Leeds fans and displaced Neil Sullivan, Tony Warner and Graham Stack, putting in a number of matchwinning saves and performances. His popularity was further increased during the 1–0 victory over Luton Town when he made his second save from a penalty kick since joining Leeds. An injury temporarily forced him out of the team with another Leeds loanee goalkeeper Graham Stack taking his place, although Ankergren reclaimed his place in the team once he regained match fitness. He soon made it publicly known that he wanted to continue his stay at Leeds past his loan spell, and Leeds' manager Dennis Wise stated he wanted to keep Ankergren at the club.

Ankergren transferred to Leeds for an undisclosed fee from Brøndby, signing a three-year contract on 6 August 2007. He was Leeds' first choice goalkeeper in the 2007–08 season. On 8 October 2007, he was named League One Player of the Month for September due to his great goalkeeping displays. In the first 18 matches of the season, he kept 10 clean sheets and retained the number one jersey for a further 23 matches. He played in Leeds' first match at the new Wembley Stadium, the 1–0 2008 League One play-off final defeat to Doncaster Rovers. He pulled off a string of impressive one-handed saves to keep his team in the match.

Ankergren took part in Leeds' pre-season tour of Ireland for the 2008–09 season but was rested on occasions to give understudies David Lucas and Alan Martin first team goalkeeping experience. He started the first four matches of the full season but failed to keep a clean sheet as his team conceded six goals. He was dropped for the League Cup tie against Crystal Palace in favour of Lucas, which Leeds went on to win 4–0, and missed out in the subsequent 2–2 draw with Bristol Rovers. He was also dropped for the 5–2 win over Crewe Alexandra again in favour of Lucas, but returned to being first choice keeper under new manager Simon Grayson.

At the start of the 2009–10 season, Ankergren was Leeds' number two goalkeeper behind Shane Higgs. He made his first appearance of the season coming on as a substitute for Higgs who suffered an injury during the match against Milton Keynes Dons, opening the door for Ankergren to start a few matches after Higgs was ruled out with a thigh injury. Leeds signed goalkeeper Frank Fielding as backup to Ankergren whilst Higgs was injured. Ankergren made his first start of the season against Carlisle United. He started a second successive match with Higgs still out and he kept a clean sheet in the match against Charlton Athletic. He continued to deputise for the injured Higgs and played 11 matches in all competitions with six clean sheets. New loan signing David Martin came into the team for the Football League Trophy match against Accrington Stanley with Ankergren dropping to the bench, but he returned to the starting line-up against Southampton and kept another clean sheet. With Higgs' injury more serious than originally thought, Ankergren has been given an extended run of matches.

On 3 January 2010, Ankergren made several important saves for Leeds in their 1–0 FA Cup victory against Premier League champions Manchester United at Old Trafford, particularly from Wayne Rooney and Danny Welbeck shots. The following matches for Leeds saw a slump in form with Leeds drawing against Wycombe Wanderers and losing against Exeter City and Carlisle United. Ankergren had a fine match for Leeds in the FA Cup match against Tottenham Hotspur on 23 January 2010. He saved a first half penalty from Jermain Defoe, and also pulled off a string of fine saves as Leeds earned a replay with a 2–2 draw.

On 3 February 2010, Ankergren put in an impressive performance after making several impressive saves against Tottenham in the FA Cup despite Leeds losing 3–1. He was involved in a penalty shoot-out for Leeds, but was unable to save a penalty for Leeds in the Football League Trophy Northern Area final second leg against Carlisle as Leeds were knocked out of the tournament after losing 6–5 in the shootout.

After Leeds' number one goalkeeper Higgs returned from a long injury lay-off in a match against Norwich City, Ankergren dropped back to the substitutes bench. Leeds were promoted to the Championship after finishing in second place. It was announced on 14 May 2010 that Ankergren would not be offered a new deal at Leeds and that he was free to find a new club. He was replaced at Leeds by a fellow Dane Kasper Schmeichel who signed a deal two weeks after Ankergren was released.

=== Brighton & Hove Albion ===
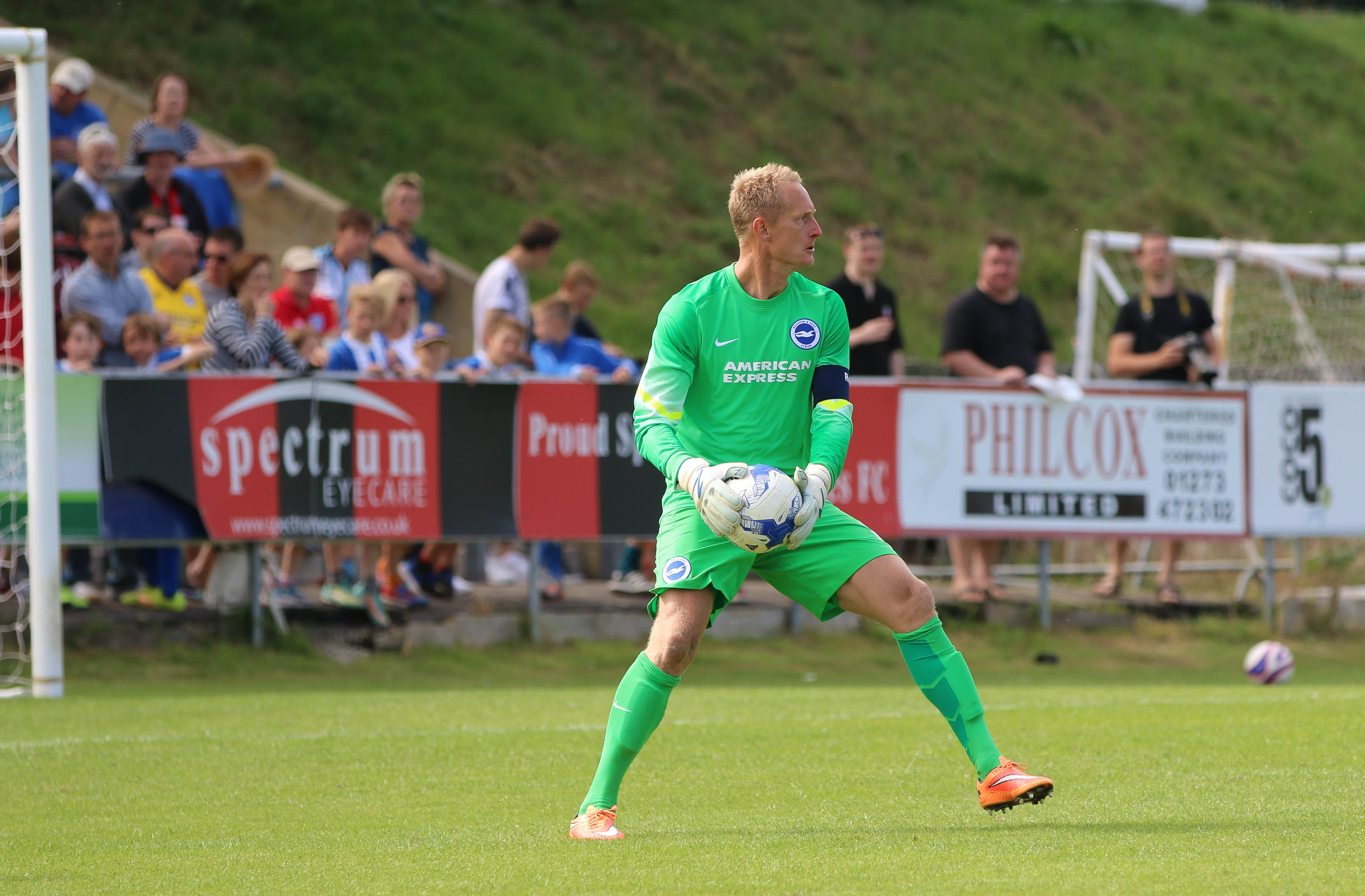
Ankergren playing for Brighton & Hove Albion in 2015

On 6 August 2010, Ankergren signed for his former Leeds assistant manager Gus Poyet at Brighton. He made his Brighton debut the following day, in Brighton's opening match of the season 2–1 win over Swindon Town. He started well at Brighton, winning the League One Player of the Month for September 2010. He won the award again in March 2011, keeping five clean sheets in eight matches. On 12 April 2011, he helped Brighton gain promotion to the Championship after a 4–3 win over Dagenham & Redbridge.

== Coaching career ==
=== Brighton & Hove Albion ===
At the end of the 2016–17 season, he retired from playing and became the assistant first team goalkeeping coach.

=== Brøndby IF ===
On 30 September 2021 he joined his former club Brøndby IF as the new first team goalkeeping coach.

=== West Ham United ===
In July 2025, Ankergren was appointed as lead first-team goalkeeping coach for West Ham United.

== International career ==
While at Køge, Ankergren played his first youth football for Denmark, making his debut for the under-17s in August 1995. He played three matches for the under-21s, but found himself the reserve of Rune Pedersen and eventually Stephan Andersen. While at Brøndby, he served as sparring partner in various Danish national team training sessions around 2003. In October 2006, he received a call-up to the Denmark national team by manager Morten Olsen, as a replacement for injured Thomas Sørensen, but was an unused substitute in the match in what turned out to be his only call up to the national team.

In January 2006 and January 2007, he played unofficial international matches with the Denmark League XI national football team.

== Career statistics ==
Appearances and goals by club, season and competition
Club	Season	League			National cup		League cup		Europe		Other		Total	
Club	Season	Division	Apps	Goals	Apps	Goals	Apps	Goals	Apps	Goals	Apps	Goals	Apps	Goals
Brøndby IF	2001–02	Danish Superliga	1	0	0	0	—		0	0	—		1	0
Brøndby IF	2002–03	Danish Superliga	16	0	1	0	—		0	0	—		17	0
Brøndby IF	2003–04	Danish Superliga	1	0	0	0	—		1	0	—		2	0
Brøndby IF	2004–05	Danish Superliga	32	0	5	0	—		2	0	—		39	0
Brøndby IF	2005–06	Danish Superliga	18	0	1	0	—		10	0	—		29	0
Brøndby IF	2006–07	Danish Superliga	18	0	1	0	—		5	0	—		24	0
Brøndby IF	Total		86	0	8	0	0	0	18	0	0	0	112	0
Leeds United (loan)	2006–07	League One	14	0	—		—		—		—		14	0
Leeds United	2007–08	League One	43	0	2	0	2	0	—		3	0	50	0
Leeds United	2008–09	League One	33	0	1	0	3	0	—		2	0	39	0
Leeds United	2009–10	League One	29	0	6	0	0	0	—		4	0	39	0
Leeds United	Total		105	0	9	0	5	0	0	0	9	0	128	0
Brighton & Hove Albion	2010–11	League One	45	0	0	0	0	0	—		1	0	46	0
Brighton & Hove Albion	2011–12	Championship	19	0	0	0	3	0	—		—		22	0
Brighton & Hove Albion	2012–13	Championship	3	0	2	0	0	0	—		0	0	5	0
Brighton & Hove Albion	2013–14	Championship	1	0	0	0	1	0	—		—		2	0
Brighton & Hove Albion	2014–15	Championship	0	0	0	0	1	0	—		—		1	0
Brighton & Hove Albion	2015–16	Championship	0	0	0	0	0	0	—		—		0	0
Brighton & Hove Albion	2016–17	Championship	0	0	1	0	0	0	—		—		1	0
Brighton & Hove Albion	Total		68	0	3	0	5	0	0	0	1	0	77	0
Career total			273	0	20	0	10	0	18	0	10	0	331	0

== Honours ==
Brighton & Hove Albion

- Football League One: 2010–11

Individual

- Football League One Player of the Month: September 2007, September 2010, March 2011
