= Ben Parker (footballer) =

English footballer

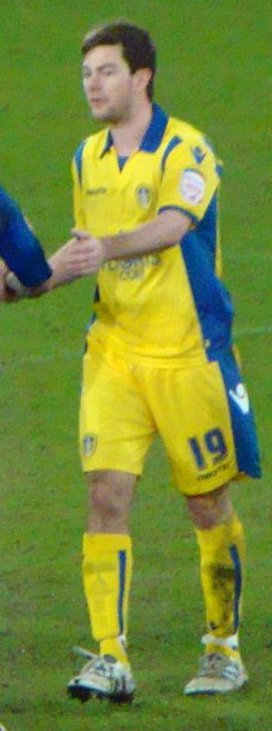
- Parker playing for Leeds United in January 2011

Personal information
- Full name: Ben Brian Colin Parker
- Date of birth: 8 November 1987 (age 39)
- Place of birth: Pontefract, England
- Position: Left back

Youth career
- 1995–2002: Leeds United

Senior career*
Years	Team	Apps	(Gls)
2005–2012	Leeds United	39	(1)
2006–2007	→ Bradford City (loan)	39	(0)
2008	→ Darlington (loan)	14	(0)
2012	→ Carlisle United (loan)	5	(1)
2013–2016	Guiseley	67	(0)
2016–2018	Harrogate Town	61	(1)

International career
2002–2003	England U16	5	(0)
2003–2004	England U17	7	(0)
2005	England U18	1	(0)
2005–2006	England U19	7	(0)
- * Club domestic league appearances and goals as of 13:09, 28 December 2017 (UTC)

Ben Brian Colin Parker (born 8 November 1987) is an English former footballer who now works for Leeds United as a pundit on LUTV (Leeds United TV) and as a community link officer. During his playing days, he was a left-back, though can also play at centre-back.

He started his career with Leeds United, but gained his first taste of senior football at Bradford City, spending the 2006–07 season on loan at the club. He then spent part of the following season on loan at Darlington. Injuries meant that he made a limited contribution to the 2009–10 campaign, as Leeds won promotion out of League One. He was loaned out to Carlisle United in January 2011, and was released by Leeds in April 2012. He has also represented England at under-16, under-17, under-18, and under-19 levels.

== Club career ==
=== Leeds United ===
Born in Pontefract, England, Parker started his career with Leeds United, but made his full debut during the 2006–07 season while on loan at local rivals Bradford City. He made his first team debut for the "Bantams" on 5 August, in a 1–0 defeat to Nottingham Forest at the City Ground. On 5 October, Leeds caretaker manager John Carver said that if Parker's appearances were being limited at Bradford then the club would rather he came back to Leeds and fought for a first team place there than sitting on the bench at Valley Parade. The loan spell was extended in late December, indicating new Leeds manager Dennis Wise wanted him to gain as much experience as possible before plunging him into the new look Leeds side. He played a total of 41 games for Bradford during his loan spell, as the club suffered relegation into League Two, and then returned to Leeds, who themselves suffered relegation into League One.

In May 2007, Parker was offered a new contract by Leeds United. He made his full debut for Leeds in a 1–0 win over Macclesfield Town in the League Cup on 14 August. Four days later, Parker made his league and home debut as a substitute in a 4–1 win over Southend United.

Having made 15 appearances for Leeds during the 2007–08 season, he was transferred to Dave Penney's Darlington on a one-month loan deal in February 2008. He made his Darlington debut on 1 March, in a 3–1 victory over Brentford at The Darlington Arena. Parker played seven games for the "Quakers" during March, before extending his loan spell until the end of the season. On 26 April, he was sent off as Darlington went from leading 2–0 to losing 3–2 to Dagenham & Redbridge. He missed the final game of the season against Peterborough United but returned for the first leg League Two play-off semi-final victory over Rochdale. However, he was not used in the second leg, as Darlington were beaten on penalties.

He returned to Leeds for the 2008–09 season, and scored his first goal for the club with a 35-yard shot in a 5–2 win in an FA Cup first round replay against Northampton Town at Sixfields on 17 November. He had a strong end to the season, becoming the "Whites" first choice left-back. He was linked with a move to Brighton & Hove Albion in January 2009. He was a major part in the opening goal of the play-off semi-final second leg against Millwall in which he made a blistering 70-yard run to cross for Luciano Becchio to fire home from six-yards. However, Leeds lost the tie 2–1 on aggregate. At the season's end he was given the Chairman's Special award, along with Jonathan Douglas.

In July 2009, Parker signed an extension to his contract which would keep him at Elland Road until summer 2012. Parker assisted a goal for Jermaine Beckford in the season opening 2–1 win against Exeter City, before he suffered a hamstring injury and was substituted. His hamstring injury kept him out for several weeks, and he then suffered a setback and had to have an operation on his hip. During his absence, he was covered by makeshift left-back Andy Hughes, with Aidy White, Shane Lowry and Tony Capaldi also covering the position. In late December, Parker returned to training, but he aggravated the injury in a reserve team game the following month. After finally recovering to full fitness he made two substitute appearances in April, before picking up a calf injury after starting the game against Milton Keynes Dons. Despite missing their first-choice left-back, Leeds were promoted to the Championship as runners up in the 2009–10 season. In April, the Chairman's Special Award was given to Parker by Ken Bates for the second successive year.

Parker's injury ruled him out of all the 2010–11 pre-season. He returned to training in late September, and manager Simon Grayson told the press that Parker would be back for selection for the first team in late October. His comeback had been steady and he played in a series of reserve team games to help build his match fitness after so long on the sidelines. On 4 January, after an 18-month battle with injury, Parker returned to the "Peacocks" starting lineup against Cardiff City, replacing regular left-back George McCartney who returned to Sunderland from his loan spell. Four days later, Parker played in a 1–1 draw against Premier League club Arsenal at the Emirates Stadium, and gave away a 90th-minute penalty after fouling Theo Walcott, which was converted to leave the final score at 1–1. Parker lost his place when Leeds re-signed George McCartney and he also began suffering with further injuries.

In July 2011, Parker returned to fitness and had the opportunity to reclaim his left-back position. He started the 2011–12 pre-season as United's first choice left back, however his injury nightmare returned when he had to be substituted against Sheffield Wednesday after a heavy challenge; he was replaced by Hungarian trialist Boldizsár Bodor. Parker made his first start of the season on 9 August against Bradford City in Leeds' 3–2 victory in the League Cup. After that Parker would miss out on several more games due to injury. He returned to training during mid-December. Parker then admitted he needed a loan move in order to re-gain his match sharpness after an injury hit two and a half years. Parker was also vocal about the club's regime about the sale of Jonny Howson, the sale prompted mass protests amongst Leeds supporters; enraged by what they perceived as a lack of ambition after failure to hold on to several key players in recent seasons and minimal investment in the first team squad. Howson's long-term friend Parker rejected the club's claims that midfielder wanted to leave the club at a fans forum whilst negotiations were taking place.

On 26 January, he joined Greg Abbott's Carlisle United on a one-month loan. Parker scored his first goal for Carlisle and his first ever league goal on his debut at Brunton Park against Chesterfield in a 2–1 win on 4 February. After playing five games for the "Cumbrians" in his one-month loan, he returned to Leeds United. On 16 April, manager Neil Warnock agreed to terminate Parker's contract by mutual consent after seven years at the club. Despite being released Parker continued to train with Leeds in order to keep fit whilst he searched for a new club.

Parker signed with Bury on non-contract terms in December 2012. However the transfer was never ratified as the club was placed under a transfer embargo by the Football League before the paperwork was completed.

At the start of the 2013/14 season, Parker who was at that time without a club, featured as a co-commentator alongside Adam Pope for several of Leeds United's games on BBC Radio Leeds.

=== Guiseley ===
At the Start of Mark Bower's reign, Parker joined Guiseley. He was named the club captain of Guiseley at the start of the 2014–15 season.

=== Harrogate ===
He signed for Harrogate Town in 2016. On 13 May 2018, Harrogate won the National League North playoffs for the 2017/18 season beating Brackley Town in the playoff final earning promotion to the National League. As the season concluded, Parker decided to leave the playing squad, but remained in charge of the club's Player Development Centre.

== International career ==
Parker has represented England at under-16, under-17, under-18, and under-19 levels. He was part of the under-17 squad at the 2004 UEFA European Under-17 Championship.

== Career statistics ==
As of match played 26 December 2017

Appearances and goals by club, season and competition
Club	Season	League			FA Cup		League Cup		Other		Total	
Club	Season	Division	Apps	Goals	Apps	Goals	Apps	Goals	Apps	Goals	Apps	Goals
Leeds United	2005–06	Championship	0	0	0	0	0	0	0	0	0	0
Leeds United	2006–07	Championship	0	0	0	0	0	0	—		0	0
Leeds United	2007–08	League One	9	0	2	0	2	0	2 (Note: Appearances in the Football League Trophy)	0	15	0
Leeds United	2008–09	League One	24	0	2	1	2	0	3 (Note: One appearance in the Football League Trophy and two in the League One play-offs)	0	31	1
Leeds United	2009–10	League One	4	0	0	0	0	0	0	0	4	0
Leeds United	2010–11	Championship	2	0	2	0	0	0	—		4	0
Leeds United	2011–12	Championship	0	0	0	0	1	0	—		1	0
Leeds United	Leeds total		39	0	6	1	5	0	5	0	55	1
Bradford City (loan)	2006–07	League One	39	0	1	0	0	0	1	0	41	0
Darlington (loan)	2007–08	League Two	14	0	—		—		0	0	14	0
Carlisle United (loan)	2011–12	League One	5	1	0	0	—		0	0	5	1
Guiseley	2013–14	Conference North	28	0	0	0	—		2 (Note: Appearances in the FA Trophy)	1	30	1
Guiseley	2014–15	Conference North	19	0	1	0	—		1	0	21	0
Guiseley	2015–16	National League	20	0	2	0	—		3	0	25	0
Guiseley	Guiseley total		67	0	3	0	0	0	6	1	76	1
Harrogate Town	2016–17	National League North	30	0	1	0	—		0	0	31	0
Harrogate Town	2017–18	National League North	17	1	0	0	—		1	0	18	1
Harrogate Town	Harrogate total		47	1	1	0	0	0	1	0	49	1
Career total			211	2	11	1	5	0	13	1	240	4

== Honours ==
Leeds United

- Football League One runner-up: 2009–10

Harrogate Town

- National League North Playoff Winner (Promotion): 2017–2018
