= Jonathan Webb (footballer) =

English footballer

Personal information
- Full name: Jonathan Philip Webb
- Date of birth: 5 January 1990 (age 36)
- Place of birth: Wetherby, England
- Position: Defender

Senior career*
Years	Team	Apps	(Gls)
2008–2010	Leeds United	0	(0)
2009	→ Newcastle Blue Star	?	(?)
- * Club domestic league appearances and goals as of 10:38, 15 May 2009 (UTC)

Jonathan Philip Webb (born 5 January 1990) is an English footballer, who made one appearance for Leeds United in 2008 during the F.A. Cup First Round clash with Northampton Town at Elland Road.

== Leeds United ==
Webb played for Leeds United as a youngster, usually playing as a central midfielder, but left the club to focus on his school work. Whilst at St. Aidan's & St. John Fisher Associated Sixth Form, Webb was called up to play for England Schoolboys. It was also during this time that he played in the St Aidan's Football team where from 2001 to 2008, the team dominated the North Yorkshire School Football circuit.

Webb was part of the team that reached the Semi Finals of the U18 English Schools Cup competition during 2007–2008.

The following year, his talent was recognised by the new Leeds manager, Gary McAllister. The highly academic Webb signed a one-year contract with the club on the basis that if he did not succeed as a professional footballer in his first year, then he would move on to University to study Business Studies.

Webb made his debut for the first-team on 17 November 2008 when appearing as a substitute against Northampton Town in the FA Cup.

Jonathan joined Newcastle Blue Star on loan on 27 February 2009. He returned to Leeds after his loan spell at Newcastle Blue Star, signing a new 6-month contract which takes him to midway through the 2009–10 season. During the 2009–10 season Webb had failed to make a single first team squad due to a hip injury and following two operations has had to retire from professional football. On 13 January 2010 Webb's contract expired and Leeds decided not to renew his deal making him a free agent.
