= Alan Martin (footballer, born 1989) =

Scottish footballer

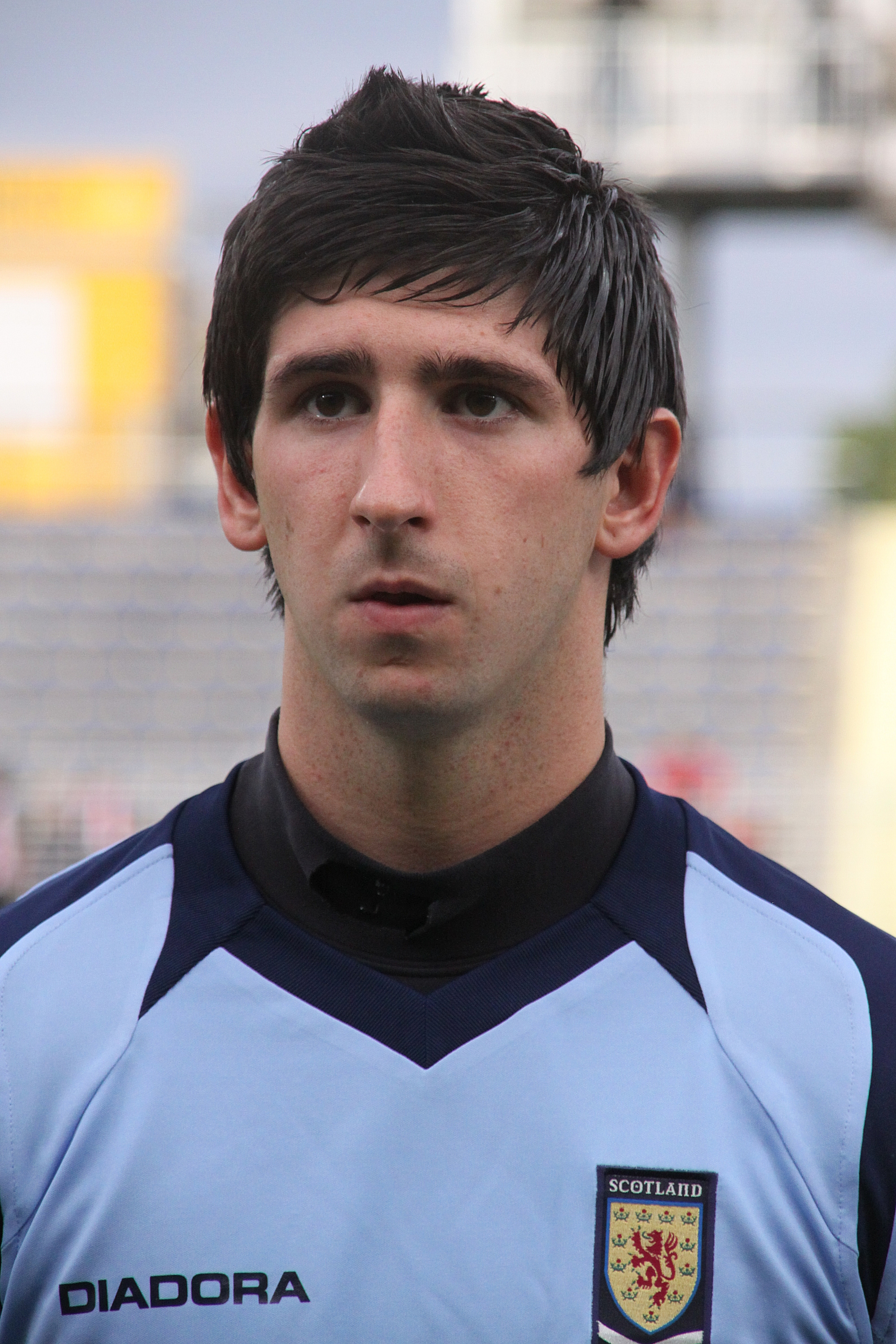
- Martin lining up for Scotland U21 in 2009

Personal information
- Full name: Alan Andrew Martin
- Date of birth: 1 January 1989 (age 37)
- Place of birth: Glasgow, Scotland
- Position: Goalkeeper

Youth career
- 2004–2006: Motherwell

Senior career*
Years	Team	Apps	(Gls)
2006–2007	Motherwell	0	(0)
2007–2011	Leeds United	0	(0)
2008–2009	→ Barrow (loan)	29	(0)
2009	→ Accrington Stanley (loan)	11	(0)
2010–2011	→ Barrow (loan)	14	(0)
2011	Ayr United	15	(0)
2011–2014	Crewe Alexandra	37	(0)
2014	Aldershot Town	3	(0)
2014–2015	Clyde	34	(0)
2015–2016	Hamilton Academical	1	(0)
2016–2017	Dumbarton	36	(0)
2017–2019	Queen of the South	49	(0)
2019–2020	East Kilbride	8	(0)
2020	Edinburgh City	3	(0)
2020	Global		
2020–2022	Bruno's Magpies	26	(0)
2022–2023	St Joseph's	14	(0)
2023–	Manchester 62	4	(0)

International career
2006–2007	Scotland U19	7	(0)
2008–2010	Scotland U21	10	(0)
- * Club domestic league appearances and goals as of 5 November 2023

Alan Andrew Martin (born 1 January 1989) is a Scottish footballer who plays as a goalkeeper for Gibraltar Football League club Manchester 62.

Martin has previously played for Motherwell, Leeds United, Barrow, Accrington Stanley, Ayr United, Crewe Alexandra, Aldershot Town, Clyde, Hamilton Academical, Dumbarton, Queen of the South, East Kilbride and Edinburgh City.

== Club career ==
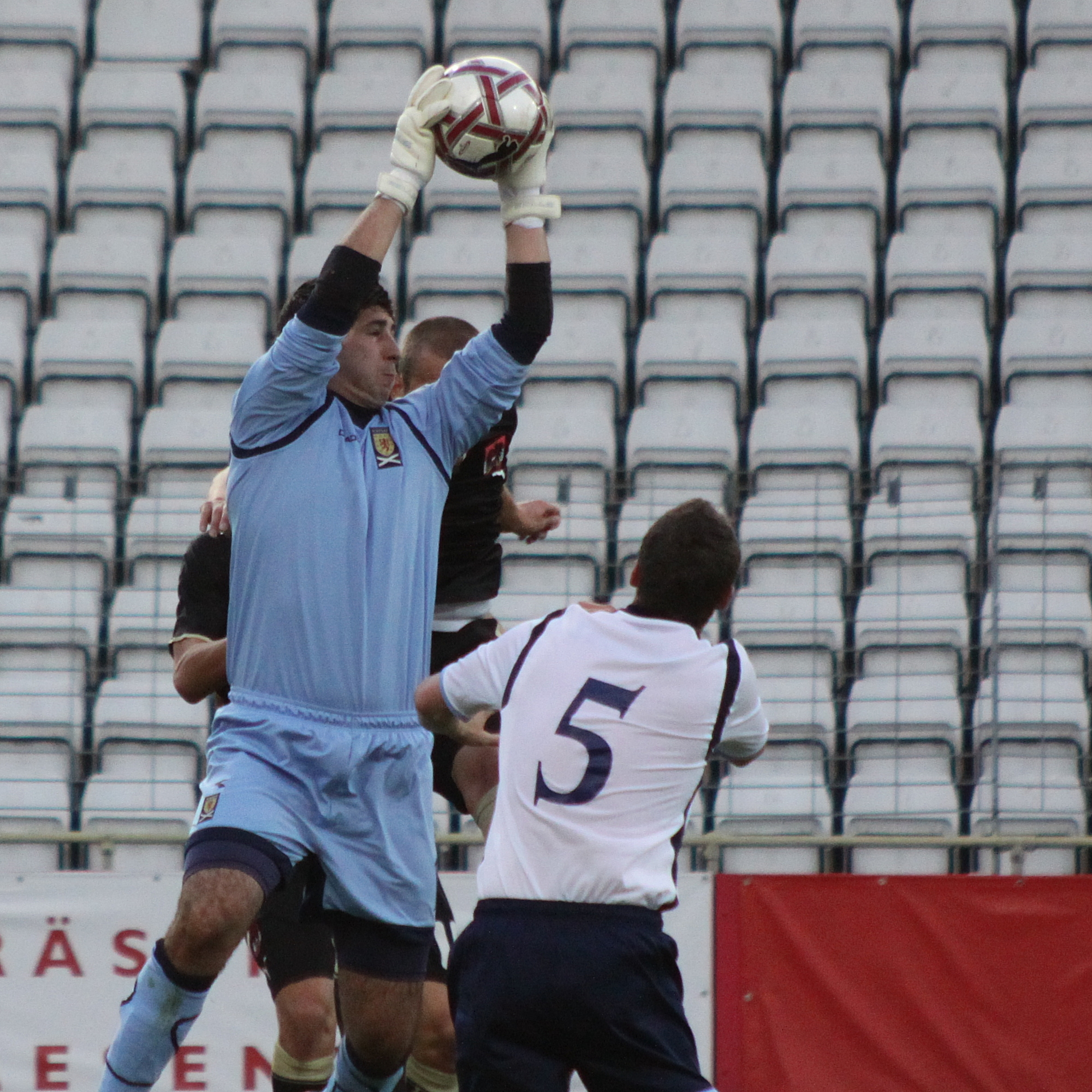
Martin playing for Scotland U21 in 2009

Martin began his career with the youth system of Scottish Premier League club Motherwell, making the first team for the 2005–06 season. Martin was an often used as a substitute for Motherwell and failed to make a League appearance for them before moving on.

Rangers made enquiries about signing Martin in 2007, before he joined League One club Leeds United on an initial two-year contract on 31 August 2007, taking the opportunity to be more involved in a first team squad. Despite not appearing for Leeds he was offered a new contract in September 2008, and moved to Barrow of the Conference National on loan to get more first team experience. Martin's time at Barrow was extended to a season-long loan and he became a fans' favourite. Martin was declared man-of-the-match in Barrow's FA Cup third-round game versus Premier League club Middlesbrough, receiving praise from the club's co-manager Dave Bayliss. Injuries reduced Martin's appearances for Barrow towards the end of that season.

Despite suggestions that Martin could be involved in the Leeds first team for the 2009–10 season, he was loaned out again and joined Accrington Stanley of League Two until January 2010. Martin had his Football League debut with Stanley in the opening game of the season in a 1–0 defeat to Rotherham United and fought for the number one jersey with fellow goalkeeper Ian Dunbavin. In total, Martin played ten matches for Accrington Stanley. On 27 October 2009, Leeds recalled him, with current number one goalkeeper Shane Higgs out with a thigh injury and loanee goalkeeper Frank Fielding having returned to his parent club. Martin expected to be the back-up keeper for Casper Ankergren. Martin was regularly on the bench whilst Higgs was out injured, but he was displaced versus Oldham Athletic with David Martin having arrived on loan from Liverpool. However, Martin returned as a Leeds substitute versus Huddersfield Town, as Leeds already had five loan players in the squad and David Martin was therefore unable to be included.

Martin was part of the Leeds squad that gained promotion to the Championship, although he was confined to being third choice keeper behind Shane Higgs and Casper Ankergren. During the summer of 2010 Ankergren left the club and was replaced by Kasper Schmeichel, which meant that Martin continued to be only the third choice goalkeeper.

On 4 August 2010, Martin re-joined Barrow on loan until January 2011. On 14 August 2010, Martin made his second debut for Barrow versus Histon and conceded three goals in a 3–1 defeat. In October, after injuries to Kasper Schmeichel and Shane Higgs, Leeds contemplated recalling Martin to act as cover but decided to let him stay at Barrow to help his development. On 4 January 2011, Martin returned to Leeds after Barrow decided they couldn't afford to keep him. On 31 January 2011, Martin's contract was cancelled by mutual consent, allowing him to find a new club, after the loan signing of Manchester City goalkeeper David González Giraldo.

After his release from Leeds, Martin moved back to Scotland to sign for part-time club Ayr United in South Ayrshire. Martin was the regular first choice keeper after signing and helped the Somerset Park club to win promotion to the Scottish Football League First Division via the play-offs in May 2011. Although being offered a contract at the Honest Men for the 2011–12, Martin declined the offer when he stated he wanted to go back to full-time football.

Martin signed an initial one-year deal with Crewe Alexandra in July 2011, after impressive performances for the club during their pre-season, finally making his first-team debut on 11 August 2012, keeping a clean sheet in a 5–0 home win over Hartlepool in a Capital One League Cup first round tie. Martin had his League One debut a week later, letting in two goals as Notts County won 2–1 at Gresty Road.

On 27 January 2014, Martin departed Crewe by mutual consent. He moved to Aldershot Town and made three league appearances for the club. Martin was released by Aldershot at the end of the 2013–14 season. In July 2014, Martin spent time on trial with Kilmarnock.

On 23 September 2014, Martin signed for Scottish League Two club Clyde. He made his debut the same day, as Clyde defeated Montrose 2–1. Martin then signed for Hamilton Academical in June 2015. After one year with the club, Martin moved to Scottish Championship club Dumbarton in August 2016, signing a one-year contract with the Sons. Following an impressive season, in which he started 39 matches, Martin won five awards at the club's Player of the Year night, including the Sons Trust Player of the Year and Players' Player of the Year.

During the middle of May 2017, Martin's future with the Sons was in doubt, with the keeper allegedly looking for a new club after admitting that the Sons latest contract offer to be unacceptable.

On 25 May 2017, Martin signed a two-year contract with Scottish Championship club Queen of the South.

On 29 June 2019, Martin signed for Lowland League club East Kilbride.

On 3 January 2020, Martin signed for Edinburgh City, He was released on a free transfer on 31 January 2020 after just four appearances for the club.

On 27 January 2020 he reportedly signed with the Philippines Football League club Global Makati. It was announced on the clubs' Instagram account. However, in the summer he moved again, this time to Gibraltar to join Bruno's Magpies. He was unveiled on the club's social media on 4 August.

== International career ==
Martin has played for Scotland at youth levels, up to and including the under-21 team. Martin had his under-21 debut versus Northern Ireland in November 2008 and despite playing only nineteen minutes due to an injury, he retained his place as the team's first-choice goalkeeper for some future matches. Martin then played for Scotland in the European Championship Qualifying play-offs.

== Honours ==
Crewe Alexandra

- Football League Two play-offs: 2012
- Football League Trophy: 2012–13
