= Sébastien Carole =

French footballer (born 1982)

Personal information
- Date of birth: 8 September 1982 (age 44)
- Place of birth: Pontoise, France
- Position: Winger

Senior career*
Years	Team	Apps	(Gls)
1999–2005	Monaco B	91	(9)
2002–2005	Monaco	8	(1)
2004	→ West Ham United (loan)	1	(0)
2004–2005	→ Châteauroux (loan)	11	(1)
2005–2006	Brighton & Hove Albion	40	(2)
2006–2008	Leeds United	45	(3)
2008–2009	Darlington	6	(0)
2009	Brighton & Hove Albion	12	(0)
2009–2010	Tranmere Rovers	4	(0)
2010	Brighton & Hove Albion	9	(0)
2011	Nice	0	(0)
2012–2015	Knaresborough Town	47	(12)
2012–2013	Bury	4	(0)
2013	Guiseley	10	(1)
2015	Harrogate Town	1	(0)
2015–2016	Bradford Park Avenue	2	(0)
2015–2016	Tadcaster Albion	0	(0)
2016–2017	Knaresborough Town	27	(7)

International career
2001–2002	France U17	3	(1)
2010	Martinique	2	(0)
- * Club domestic league appearances and goals as of 14:26, 26 September 2015 (UTC)

Sébastien Carole (born 8 September 1982) is a French former professional footballer who played as a winger. He represented Martinique at international level.

He started his career at AS Monaco and played mostly in England, where he made a combined 121 appearances for West Ham United, Brighton & Hove Albion, Leeds United, Darlington, Tranmere Rovers and Bury. He last played in non-League football for Knaresborough Town.

He also represented France U17's.

== Career ==
=== AS Monaco ===
Carole started his playing career in 2002 with AS Monaco, where he had been since he was 14 years old. In February 2004 he joined English side West Ham United on loan. However, in three months with the Hammers he made just one substitute appearance. He spent the 2004–05 season on loan at Ligue 2 club Châteauroux, making nine league appearances and scoring one goal.

In total Carole made nine league appearances scoring one goal in his three years with Monaco. He also played for Monaco in the UEFA Champions League and UEFA Cup. He was part of the Monaco squad which reached the Champions League final in 2004 but did not have any involvement in the 3–0 final loss to FC Porto.

=== Brighton & Hove Albion ===
On 12 August 2005 Carole signed a two-year contract with English Championship side Brighton & Hove Albion for an undisclosed fee. He played 42 games in total for Brighton in the 2005–06 season as they finished bottom in the Championship and were relegated to League One. In June he activated a relegation release clause in his contract and Albion confirmed that Carole was to join Leeds United and Carole joined them on 23 June 2006.

=== Leeds United ===
Carole signed a three-year deal with Leeds, joining them on 5 July 2006. he featured in many games under previous manager Kevin Blackwell but found first-team opportunities under Dennis Wise difficult. In November 2006 the Yorkshire Evening Post claimed that Wise was about to release Carole. He made a total of 18 appearances in the 2006–07 season.

In 2007–08 he made 34 appearances and scored his first goal for the club on 29 November 2007 in a 1–1 draw with Gillingham. After failing to feature in manager Gary McAllister's plans he was released from his contract by mutual consent on 1 September 2008. He played a total of 52 games in his three years with the club, scoring three goals.

=== Darlington ===
After a short trial with Bradford City Carole joined League Two side Darlington on a short-term contract on 28 November 2008. He played seven games with Darlington during a two-month stay, before leaving the club in January 2009.

=== Return to Brighton ===
On 29 January 2009, after a successful trial Carole re-joined League One side Brighton & Hove Albion until the end of the 2008–09 season. He made 12 appearances and on 12 May Brighton announced that they would be releasing Carole when his contract expired at the end of June 2009.

=== Tranmere Rovers ===
Carole joined Tranmere Rovers on a short-term contract until January 2010.

=== Back to Brighton ===
On 31 December 2009, Carole returned to Brighton on trial, who are now managed by former Leeds United assistant manager Gus Poyet where Carole had a regular spell in team under the management of Dennis Wise and Poyet. On 11 January 2010, it was confirmed that Carole had agreed a weekly contract with Brighton & Hove Albion. He left Brighton after his pre-season offer did not work.

=== OGC Nice ===
Carole joined OGC Nice in Ligue 1 the top division in France in November 2010.

=== Non-league ===
Carole then played in the Northern Counties East League for Knaresborough Town. He joined Knaresborough Town in 2012 and played with the club until 2014, when commitments allowed.

=== Bury ===
Bury signed Carole on non-contract terms on 27 November 2012 after he impressed manager Kevin Blackwell whilst on trial at the club.

=== Return to non-league ===
Guiseley signed Carole on 26 March 2013. In his debut against Gainsborough Trinity he came off the bench and scored, helping Guiseley to a 2–1 victory. He made his first start for the club in the next game, winning 2–0 against Workington.

Carole joined Bradford Park Avenue as a free signing on 7 August 2015 after being on trial at the club. He joined Tadcaster Albion in April 2016, making one appearance in the Northern Counties East League Cup. He was an unused substitute in the following league match, but did not feature again. He later returned to Knaresborough Town for the 2016–17 season.

== International career ==
Carole represented France at every level up to under-19.

In 2010, Martinique selected Carole to play in the Didgicel Cup held in the Caribbean, he played in three games.

== Outside football ==
In 2014, Carole set up a football academy at the Grammar School at Leeds.

Carole's son Keenan Carole plays for Leeds United's academy.
