= Shane Higgs =

English footballer (born 1977)

Personal information
- Full name: Shane Peter Higgs
- Date of birth: 13 May 1977 (age 49)
- Place of birth: Oxford, England
- Height: 6 ft 2 in (1.88 m)
- Position: Goalkeeper

Youth career
- 1994–1995: Bristol Rovers

Senior career*
Years	Team	Apps	(Gls)
1995–1998	Bristol Rovers	10	(0)
1995	→ York City (loan)	0	(0)
1998–1999	Worcester City	28	(0)
1999–2009	Cheltenham Town	240	(0)
2008–2009	→ Wolverhampton Wanderers (loan)	0	(0)
2009–2011	Leeds United	25	(0)
2011–2012	Northampton Town	3	(0)
Total		306	(0)
- * Club domestic league appearances and goals

Shane Peter Higgs (born 13 May 1977) is an English former professional footballer who played as a goalkeeper. He made 306 appearances in the Football League and Football Conference between 1996 and 2012, most notably spending ten years at Cheltenham Town.

== Career ==
=== Early career ===
Born in Oxford, Oxfordshire, Higgs began his career as a trainee at Bristol Rovers. He joined York City on loan in September 1995, but failed to make any appearances for the team. He made his league debut for Rovers on 19 November 1996 in a 2–1 defeat to Burnley. However, he was unable to stake a regular claim and was given a free transfer to non-League Worcester City in 1998, after making 10 appearances for Rovers.

=== Cheltenham Town ===
Higgs spent a single season with Worcester, before being signed by Cheltenham Town for £10,000 in 1999, after impressing in an FA XI v Southern Football League representative match in 1998. He spent nearly four years as reserve to Steve Book, making only a handful of appearances, before finally breaking into the first team in March 2003.

He then become their firm number one and winning the club's Player of the Year award twice. Whilst at Cheltenham he gained two promotions and was a fixture in Cheltenhams first team for many years. His spell at Cheltenham came to an end when he joined Wolves on loan and after his contract expired at Cheltenham he left the club to join Leeds United on a free transfer.

=== Wolverhampton Wanderers ===
Higgs joined Wolverhampton Wanderers of the Championship on a month's loan on 27 November 2008, twice extended to reach the end of the season. However, he did not make an appearance for the club as they won promotion. He acted as number two goalkeeper whilst Wolves goalkeepers Matt Murray, Wayne Hennessey and Carl Ikeme had all faced spells on the sidelines. Before he moved to Leeds Wolves manager Mick McCarthy highly recommended Higgs to Leeds manager Simon Grayson.

=== Leeds United ===
Higgs joined the then League One side Leeds United on a free transfer on 3 July 2009, signing a one-year contract. His chance came in pre-season against Newcastle United and after a string of fine saves in the game and keeping a clean sheet in a 0–0 draw, Higgs retained his place for the friendlies against Blackburn Rovers and Burnley where he continued to impress. Higgs started the season as first-choice goalkeeper after fierce competition from former number one Casper Ankergren, and he helped the club earn a valuable point away to Southend United, after saving a Lee Barnard penalty kick in a 0–0 draw. Higgs conceded his first goal from open play in the league in the 4–1 over Gillingham, which was the eighth game of the season.

Higgs suffered an injury against Milton Keynes Dons and had to be replaced by Ankergren. It was revealed Higgs' injury was a thigh injury and he was expected to miss a few games as a result. Higgs returned from injury and started the game against Norwich City but suffered a recurrence of his thigh injury and had to be substituted. He was replaced by Casper Ankergren. He signed a new contract with Leeds in November 2009, which contracted him at the club until June 2011. Higgs was on the road to recovery, but still was not fit enough to return to the Leeds squad, as a result Leeds signed David Martin on loan as backup for Ankergren.

After almost six months out with injury, Higgs returned to Leeds' squad when he was named as a substitute in the loss against Millwall. Higgs returned to the starting line-up in the next game against Norwich City replacing understudy Ankergren. Higgs played an instrumental part as Leeds were promoted to the Football League Championship after finishing in second place in League One and thus earning automatic promotion, however Leeds' signing of Kasper Schmeichel, on 27 May 2010, put Higgs' position as number one under threat.

After much speculation over pre-season who would be first choice goalkeeper for the forthcoming season, it was Kasper Schmeichel who was given the nod ahead of Higgs, when he made his debut for the club on 7 August 2010 in Leeds United's opening Football League Championship defeat against Derby County. Higgs came into the starting line-up for his first appearance of the season, coming into the starting line-up against Leicester City in the League Cup.

Higgs came into the starting line-up against Swansea City after Kasper Schmeichel picked up an ankle injury. After conceding five against Barnsley in a 5–2 defeat, Higgs kept a clean sheet in the next game against Doncaster Rovers. Higgs was substituted in the second half of the match against Ipswich Town after picking up an injury. Higgs returned to Leeds' bench against Coventry City after recovering from injury.

After playing just seven league games for Leeds in The Championship, after being understudy to Kasper Schmeichel, Higgs left Leeds after it was announced the club were not renewing his contract.

=== Northampton Town ===
On 22 December 2011, it was announced that Northampton Town had signed Higgs on an 18-month contract. In November 2012, his contract was released by mutual consent.

== Honours ==
Cheltenham Town

- Football League Two play-offs: 2006

Wolverhampton Wanderers

- Football League Championship: 2008–09

Leeds United

- Football League One second-place promotion: 2009–10

Individual

- Cheltenham Town Players' Player of the Year: 2003–04, 2006–07, 2007–08
