= List of Leeds United F.C. players =

This article is a list of notable footballers who have played for Leeds United. Generally, this means players that have played 100 or more first-class matches for the club. However, some players who have played fewer matches are also included, as are the club's founder members and some players who fell just short of the 100 total but made significant contributions to the club's history (e.g. Don Revie).

Players are listed according to the date of their first professional contract signed with the club. Appearances and goals are for first-team competitive matches only; wartime matches are excluded. Substitute appearances are also included.

== Notable players ==
Correct as of 1 June 2026 counting Leeds United first team games in either League, Cup or play-off games. Criteria for including players is 100+ games or being a particularly high profile player (e.g. Tony Yeboah)

Name	Nationality	Position	Leeds career	Appearances	Goals
Jim Baker	England	CB	1920–1926	208	2
Albert Duffield	England	CB	1920–1925	211	0
Jimmy Frew	Scotland	LB	1920–1924	99	0
Ernie Hart	England	CB	1920–1936	472	15
Billy Down	England	GK	1920–1925	101	0
Harry Sherwin	England	CF	1921–1925	108	9
Jack Swann	England	ST	1921–1925	116	50
Percy Whipp	Scotland	IF	1922–1927	154	46
Joe Harris	Scotland	RW	1922–1925	134	15
Bill Menzies	Scotland	LB	1922–1932	260	2
George Reed	England	CB	1924–1934	150	3
Tom Townsley	Scotland	CB	1925–1931	167	2
Bobby Turnbull	England	RW	1925–1932	215	46
Harry Duggan	Ireland/ Republic of Ireland	W	1925–1936	196	47
Willis Edwards	England	DF	1925–1943; WWII	444; 24	6; 2
Russell Wainscoat	England	IF	1925–1931	226	93
Tom Jennings	Scotland	FW	1925–1931	174	117
Jimmy Potts	England	GK	1926–1934	262	0
Tom Mitchell	England	LW	1926–1931	152	21
Charlie Keetley	England	FW	1927–1934	169	110
Jock White	Scotland	IF	1927–1930	117	33
Tom Cochrane	England	LW	1928–1936	259	27
George Milburn	England	RB	1928–1937	166	1
Jack Milburn	England	LB	1928–1939; WWII	408; 64	30; 6
Billy Furness	England	IL	1928–1937	257	66
Wilf Copping	England	CB	1929–1934; WWII	183; 28	4; 0
John Mahon	England	RW	1929–1935	117	33
Arthur Hydes	England	CF	1930–1938	137	82
Bert Sproston	England	RB	1933–1938	140	1
Gordon Hodgson	England	CF	1933–1938	120	67
Eric Stephenson	England	IL	1934–1944; WWII	115; 39	22; 7
Ken Gadsby	England	LB	1934–1948; WWII	87; 84	0; 1
Bobby Browne	Ireland	WH	1935–1947; WWII	114; 7	0; 0
Aubrey Powell	Wales	IL	1935–1948; WWII	124; 126	25; 38
Jim Milburn	England	LB	1936–1952; WWII	220; 52	17; 4
Tom Holley	England	CH	1936–1949; WWII	169; 104	1; 2
George Ainsley	England	CF	1936–1947; WWII	96; 64	34; 35
Jim Twomey	Ireland	GK	1937–1949; WWII	112; 5	0; 0
Davy Cochrane	Ireland	RW	1937–1950; WWII	186; 13	32; 7
John Short	England	IF	1937–1948; WWII	63; 59	19; 36
Gerry Henry	England	IR	1938–1947; WWII	47; 186	5; 94
Len Browning	England	FW	1946–1951	105	46
Jimmy Dunn	Scotland	RB	1947–1959	443	1
John Charles	Wales	CB/FW	1947–1957; 1962	327	157
Tommy Burden	England	MF	1948–1954	259	13
Jimmy McCabe	England	WH	1948–1954	161	0
Grenville Hair	England	LB	1948–1964	474	2
Harry Searson	England	GK	1949–1952	116	0
Ray Iggleden	England	IL	1949–1955	181	50
Harold Williams	Wales	RW	1949–1957	228	35
Eric Kerfoot	England	MF	1949–1959	349	10
John Scott	England	GK	1950–1956	114	0
Jack Charlton	England	CB	1952–1973	762	95
Bobby Forrest	England	RW	1952–1959	121	37
Albert Nightingale	England	ST	1952–1957	135	48
Roy Wood	England	GK	1952–1960	203	0
George Meek	Scotland	RW	1952–1960	199	19
Jackie Overfield	England	LW	1953–1960	163	20
Chris Crowe	England	IR	1956–1960	98	27
Wilbur Cush	Northern Ireland	RH	1957–1960	90	9
Don Revie	England	IF	1958–1963	80	12
Noel Peyton	Republic of Ireland	IL	1958–1963	117	20
Billy Bremner	Scotland	MF	1959–1976	771	115
Freddie Goodwin	England	HB	1960–1964	120	2
Willie Bell	Scotland	LB	1960–1967	260	18
Albert Johanneson	South Africa	LW	1961–1970	200	68
Paul Reaney	England	RB	1961–1978	745	9
Norman Hunter	England	CB	1961–1976	724	21
Terry Cooper	England	LB	1961–1975	350	11
Paul Madeley	England	CB	1962–1980	724	34
Peter Lorimer	Scotland	ST	1962–1978; 1983–1985	616	219
Gary Sprake	Wales	GK	1962–1973	506	0
Jim Storrie	Scotland	FW	1962–1967	156	67
Bobby Collins	Scotland	MF	1962–1967	167	25
Rod Belfitt	England	IF	1963–1971	128	33
Johnny Giles	Republic of Ireland	IF	1963–1975	525	114
Jimmy Greenhoff	England	ST	1963–1968	136	36
Mick Bates	England	MF	1964–1976	187	9
Eddie Gray	Scotland	LW	1965–1984	577	68
David Harvey	Scotland	GK	1965–1979; 1983–1985	446	0
Mike O'Grady	England	RW	1965–1969	121	17
Terry Yorath	Wales	MF	1967–1976	196	12
Mick Jones	England	FW	1967–1975	312	111
Allan Clarke	England	ST	1969–1978	364	151
Joe Jordan	Scotland	FW	1970–1978	220	48
Frank Gray	Scotland	LB	1971–1979	246	25
Trevor Cherry	England	LB	1972–1982	484	31
Gordon McQueen	Scotland	CB	1972–1978	171	19
Carl Harris	Wales	RW	1973–1982	176	29
Byron Stevenson	Wales	DF	1973–1982	110	5
Gwyn Thomas	Wales	MF	1975–1984	103	3
Ray Hankin	England	FW	1976–1980	103	36
Tony Currie	England	MF	1976–1979	124	16
Arthur Graham	Scotland	LW	1977–1983	260	47
Brian Flynn	Wales	MF	1977–1982	177	11
Paul Hart	England	CB	1978–1983	223	20
John Lukic	England	GK	1978–1983; 1990–1996	430	0
Terry Connor	England	RW	1979–1983	108	22
Gary Hamson	England	MF	1979–1986	152	4
Martin Dickinson	England	CB	1980–1986	119	2
Neil Aspin	England	RB	1981–1989	244	6
John Sheridan	Republic of Ireland	CM	1982–1989	267	52
Andy Ritchie	England	ST	1983–1987	159	44
Mervyn Day	England	GK	1985–1993	268	0
Ian Baird	England	FW	1985–1987; 1990–1991	192	58
David Rennie	Scotland	DF	1986–1989	119	7
Peter Haddock	England	CB	1986–1991	146	1
Micky Adams	England	LB	1987–1989	89	3
John Pearson	England	FW	1987–1991	127	12
Glynn Snodin	England	LB	1987–1992	116	13
David Batty	England	CM	1987–1993; 1998–2004	382	4
Bobby Davison	England	ST	1987–1992	110	35
Gary Speed	Wales	MF	1988–1996	311	57
Vinnie Jones	Wales	MF	1989–1990	53	5
Gordon Strachan	Scotland	MF	1989–1995	244	45
Chris Fairclough	England	CB	1989–1995	240	23
Mel Sterland	England	RB	1989–1994	146	20
Carl Shutt	England	ST	1989–1993	106	25
Gary McAllister	Scotland	MF	1990–1996	294	45
Chris Whyte	England	CB	1990–1993	146	6
Lee Chapman	England	FW	1990–1993; 1996	174	80
Gary Kelly	Republic of Ireland	RB	1991–2007	531	4
David Wetherall	England	CB	1991–1999	250	18
Rod Wallace	England	ST	1991–1998	256	66
Tony Dorigo	England	LB	1991–1997	208	5
Eric Cantona	France	FW	1992	34	11
Brian Deane	England	FW	1993–1997; 2004–2005	201	45
Carlton Palmer	England	MF	1994–1997	130	7
Lucas Radebe	South Africa	CB	1994–2005	262	3
Tony Yeboah	Ghana	FW	1995–1997	62	33
Ian Harte	Republic of Ireland	LB	1995–2004	288	39
Harry Kewell	Australia	AM	1995–2003	242	63
Nigel Martyn	England	GK	1996–2003	273	0
Stephen McPhail	Republic of Ireland	CM	1996–2004	97	3
Jimmy Floyd Hasselbaink	Netherlands	ST	1997–1999	87	42
Lee Bowyer	England	RM	1996–2003	265	55
Alf-Inge Haaland	Norway	MF	1997–2000	92	8
Alan Smith	England	FW	1997–2004	228	56
Paul Robinson	England	GK	1997–2004	119	1
Jonathan Woodgate	England	CB	1996–2003	142	4
Eirik Bakke	Norway	MF	1999–2006	196	21
Danny Mills	England	RB	1999–2004	141	4
Michael Bridges	England	FW	1999–2004	82	21
Jason Wilcox	England	LW	1999–2004	106	6
Mark Viduka	Australia	ST	2000–2004	166	72
Dominic Matteo	Scotland	DF	2000–2004	146	4
Matthew Kilgallon	England	CB	2000–2007	95	3
Rio Ferdinand	England	CB	2000–2002	73	2
Robbie Fowler	England	ST	2001–2003	33	14
Frazer Richardson	England	RB	2001–2009	173	5
James Milner	England	MF	2002–2004	54	5
Aaron Lennon	England	RW	2003–2005	43	1
David Healy	Northern Ireland	ST	2004–2007	121	31
Paul Butler	Republic of Ireland	CB	2004–2007	106	4
Neil Sullivan	Scotland	GK	2004–2007	110	0
Danny Pugh	England	LB	2004–2006; 2012–2014	119	10
Eddie Lewis	United States	LM	2005–2007	96	9
Manuel Rui Marques	Angola	CB	2005–2010	100	4
Jonathan Douglas	Republic of Ireland	CM	2005–2009	166	11
Jonathan Howson	England	CM	2006-2012	225	29
Jermaine Beckford	Jamaica; England	ST	2006–2010	152	85
Fabian Delph	England	CM	2006–2009; 2012	57	6
Casper Ankergren	Denmark	GK	2006–2010	143	0
Andrew Hughes	England	MF	2007–2011	139	1
Neil Kilkenny	Australia	CM	2008–2011	144	11
Bradley Johnson	England	CM	2008–2011	140	17
Robert Snodgrass	Scotland	RW	2008–2012	189	41
Luciano Becchio	Argentina	FW	2008–2013	221	86
Aidan White	Republic of Ireland; England	LB	2008–2015	111	2
Tom Lees	England	CB	2009–2014	135	4
Max Gradel	Ivory Coast	LW	2009–2011	79	24
Ross McCormack	Scotland	FW	2010–2014	158	58
Charlie Taylor	England	LB	2011–2017	97	3
Jason Pearce	England	CB	2012–2015	107	2
Rodolph Austin	Jamaica	CM	2012–2015	112	10
Sam Byram	England	RB	2012–2016; 2023-2026	143; 81	10; 3
Alex Mowatt	England	CM	2013–2017	125	13
Luke Murphy	England	CM	2013–2018	111	7
Lewis Cook	England	CM	2014–2016	85	2
Marco Silvestri	Italy	GK	2014–2017	98	0
Gaetano Berardi	Switzerland	FB	2014–2021	157	2
Liam Cooper	Scotland	CB	2014–2024	284	11
Kalvin Phillips	England	CM	2014–2022	232	14
Chris Wood	New Zealand	FW	2015–2017	88	44
Stuart Dallas	Northern Ireland	MF/DF	2015–2024	267	28
Kemar Roofe	Jamaica	FW	2016–2019	122	34
Pablo Hernández	Spain	W/AM	2016–2021	175	36
Luke Ayling	England	RB	2016–2024	268	11
Pontus Jansson	Sweden	CB	2016–2019	120	9
Ezgjan Alioski	North Macedonia	LB/LW	2017–2021	171	22
Mateusz Klich	Poland	CM	2017–2023	195	24
Jack Harrison	England	LW/RW	2018–2026	219	34
Patrick Bamford	England	FW	2018–2025	205	60
Illan Meslier	France	GK	2019–2026	214	0
Pascal Struijk	Netherlands	CB	2018–2026	196	14
Raphinha	Brazil	RW	2020–2022	67	17
Rodrigo Moreno	Spain	FW	2020–2023	97	28
Daniel James	Wales	RW	2021–	144	29
Junior Firpo	Dominican Republic	LB	2021–2025	119	6
Wilfried Gnonto	Italy	RW/LW	2022–	147	23
Joël Piroe	Netherlands	FW	2023–	118	34
Ethan Ampadu	Wales	CB/CM	2023–	126	3
Joe Rodon	Wales	CB	2023–	136	3

== Player of the Year ==
Players in bold won the Player of the Year award on more than one occasion

Year	Player of the Year	Players' Player of the Year	Young Player of the Year	Academy Player of the Year	Women's Player of the Year
1971	Norman Hunter	—	—	—	
1972	Peter Lorimer	—	—	—	
1973	Allan Clarke	—	—	—	
1974	Mick Jones	—	—	—	
1975	**Gordon McQueen**	—	—	—	
1976	Paul Madeley	—	—	—	
1977	**Gordon McQueen**	—	—	—	
1978	Tony Currie	—	—	—	
1979	Brian Flynn	—	—	—	
1980	John Lukic	—	—	—	
1981	Trevor Cherry	—	—	—	
1982	Eddie Gray	—	—	—	
1983	Kenny Burns	—	—	—	
1984	Tommy Wright	—	—	—	
1985	Neil Aspin	—	—	—	
1986	Ian Snodin	—	—	—	
1987	John Sheridan	—	—	—	
1988	Peter Haddock	—	—	—	
1989	Ian Baird	—	—	—	
1990	Chris Fairclough	—	—	—	
1991	David Batty	—	—	–	
1992	Tony Dorigo	—	—	—	
1993	Gordon Strachan	—	—	—	
1994	Gary McAllister	—	—	—	
1995	Brian Deane	—	—	—	
1996	Tony Yeboah	—	—	—	
1997	Nigel Martyn	—	—	—	
1998	Lucas Radebe	—	Tommy Knarvik	—	
1999	**Lee Bowyer**	—	Alan Smith	—	
2000	Harry Kewell	—	Eirik Bakke	—	
2001	**Lee Bowyer**	Lee Bowyer	Paul Robinson	—	
2002	Rio Ferdinand	—	Alan Smith	—	
2003	Paul Robinson	Alan Smith	James Milner	—	
2004	Alan Smith	Alan Smith	—	—	
2005	Neil Sullivan	Neil Sullivan	Aaron Lennon	—	
2006	Gary Kelly	Paul Butler; Gary Kelly	Matthew Kilgallon	—	
2007	Eddie Lewis	—	—	—	
2008	**Jermaine Beckford**	Jermaine Beckford	Jonny Howson	—	
2009	**Jermaine Beckford**	Fabian Delph	Fabian Delph	—	
2010	Patrick Kisnorbo	Patrick Kisnorbo	Aidan White	—	
2011	Max Gradel	Max Gradel	Jonny Howson	—	
2012	Robert Snodgrass	Robert Snodgrass	Tom Lees	—	
2013	Sam Byram	Sam Byram	Sam Byram	—	
2014	Ross McCormack	Ross McCormack	Alex Mowatt	—	
2015	Alex Mowatt	Alex Mowatt	Lewis Cook	—	
2016	Charlie Taylor	Stuart Dallas	Lewis Cook	—	
2017	Chris Wood	Chris Wood	Ronaldo Vieira	Callum Nice	
2018	**Pablo Hernández**	Pablo Hernández	Bailey Peacock-Farrell	—	Cath Hammill
2019	**Pablo Hernández**	Pablo Hernández	Jack Clarke	—	Cath Hammill
2020	**Pablo Hernández**	Stuart Dallas	Ben White	Robbie Gotts	Rebecca Hunt
2021	Stuart Dallas	Stuart Dallas	Illan Meslier	—	Abbie Brown
2022	-	-	-	—	-
2023	-	-	-	—	-
2024	Ethan Ampadu	Crysencio Summerville	Archie Gray	—	Jess Rousseau
2025	Daniel James	Ao Tanaka	Wilfried Gnonto	—	Amy Woodruff
2026	Ethan Ampadu	Ethan Ampadu	-	Ollie Pickles(U21); Jack Morris(U18)	Drew Green

== Captains ==
Jim Baker was the first ever captain of Leeds United and led the club to the 1923–24 second division championship.

From	To	Name	Vice-captain	Acting captains
1920	1926	Jim Baker		
1926	1933	Jimmy Potts		
1933	1934	Wilf Copping		
1934	1937	Jock McDougall		
1937	1949	Tom Holley		
1949	1954	Tommy Burden		
1954	1955	Eric Kerfoot		
1955	1957	John Charles		
1957	1960	Wilbur Cush	Don Revie (1959–60)	
1960	1962	Freddie Goodwin		
1962	1966	Bobby Collins		
1966	1976	Billy Bremner	Jack Charlton (1965–66)	
1976	1983	Trevor Cherry	David Harvey (1982–83)	
1983	1984	David Harvey		
1984	1985	Peter Lorimer		
1985	1986	Ian Snodin		
1986	1987	Ian Baird		
1987	1989	Mark Aizlewood	Jack Ashurst (until 1988)	
1989	1994	Gordon Strachan		
1994	1996	Gary McAllister		
1996	2001	Lucas Radebe	Gary Kelly	
2001	2002	Rio Ferdinand	Dominic Matteo	
2002	2004	Dominic Matteo	Gary Kelly	Lucas Radebe
2004	2006	Paul Butler	Gary Kelly	Sean Gregan
2006	2007	Kevin Nicholls	Shaun Derry	Jonathan Douglas
2007	2007	Jonathan Douglas	David Healy	Alan Thompson
2007	2008	Alan Thompson	Jonathan Douglas	Andrew Hughes; Rui Marques
2008	2009	Frazer Richardson	Paul Telfer (until Jan 2009); Richard Naylor (from Jan 2009)	
2009	2011	Richard Naylor	Jonny Howson	Jermaine Beckford
2011	2012	Jonny Howson	Patrick Kisnorbo	
2012	2012	Robert Snodgrass	Andy Lonergan	
2012	2013	Lee Peltier	Jason Pearce	
2013	2014	Rodolph Austin	Lee Peltier	
2014	2014	Ross McCormack	Jason Pearce	
2014	2014	Jason Pearce	Stephen Warnock	
2014	2015	Stephen Warnock		
2015	2015	Liam Cooper	Sol Bamba	
2015	2017	Liam Bridcutt	Liam Cooper	Kyle Bartley
2017	2021	Liam Cooper	Luke Ayling	Gaetano Berardi
2021	2023	Liam Cooper	Luke Ayling	Stuart Dallas
2023	2024	Liam Cooper	Pascal Struijk	Ethan Ampadu
2024	2025	Ethan Ampadu	Pascal Struijk	Illan Meslier
2025	2026	Ethan Ampadu	Pascal Struijk	
2026	Pres.	Ethan Ampadu	Leadersip Group; Joe Rodon; Jaka Bijol; Dominic Calvert-Lewin; James Justin	
