= 2010–11 Leeds United F.C. season =

2010–11 season of Leeds United

Leeds United
2010–11 season
- Chairman: Ken Bates
- Manager: Simon Grayson
- Stadium: Elland Road
- Championship: 7th
- FA Cup: Third round
- League Cup: Second round
- Top goalscorer: League: Luciano Becchio (19); All: Luciano Becchio (20)
- Highest home attendance: 38,232 vs Arsenal (19 January 2011, FA Cup)
- Lowest home attendance: 12,602 vs Lincoln City (10 August 2010, League Cup)
- Average home league attendance: 27,297
Home colours	Away colours

The 2010–11 season saw Leeds United competing in the Championship (known as the npower Championship for sponsorship reasons) following promotion the previous season.

== Season summary ==
In the league the club just missed out on the play-offs, after being in contention for the majority of the season. In other competitions, the club performed poorly in the League Cup, going out in their first match, however made it to the third round of the FA Cup forcing Premier League giants Arsenal to a replay in the process.

For the first time since 1990–91, Simon Grayson's team saw four players, Becchio (20), Gradel (18), Somma (12) and Howson (11), make it in to double figures in the scoring charts. After a disastrous end to the previous season, Gradel rejuvenated himself and picked up both the Fans' and Players' Player of the Year with Young Player going to the much improved Howson. Off the field, Chairman Ken Bates consolidated his ownership of the club by purchasing a majority shareholding in the club.

== Events ==
This is a list of the significant events to occur at the club during the 2010–11 season, presented in chronological order (starting from 14 May 2010 and ending on the final day of the club's final match in the 2010–11 season. Results of any disclipinaries etc. relevant to this season are also listed.) This list does not include transfers or new contracts, which are listed in the transfers section below, or match results, which are in the matches section.

=== May ===
- 14 May: The club release a "released and retained" list with eight players being released, two players being offered new contracts and four players – Trésor Kandol, Ľubomír Michalík, Andy Robinson and Alan Sheehan – being placed on the transfer list.

=== June ===
- 17 June: The fixtures for the 2010–11 Championship campaign are revealed. Leeds start the season on 7 August at home to Derby County and will finish it away at QPR on 8 May.

=== July ===
- 1 July: The players return for pre-season training with new faces including Fede Bessone, Paul Connolly, Billy Paynter and Kasper Schmeichel.
- 8 July: Manager Simon Grayson confirms that Richard Naylor will remain club captain for the new season.
- 10 July: The squad depart to Slovakia for their pre-season tour. The travelling squad includes all first teamers except transfer listed Kandol, Michalik, Robinson and Sheehan, injured Naylor and Parker and youngsters Darville, Elliott and Hatfield.
- 13 July: Simon Grayson signs a new three-year contract as club manager.
- 29 July: The squad numbers for the new season are announced with no. 2 Crowe being demoted to no. 20 in favour of Connolly. Meanwhile, Gradel is promoted to no. 7 from no. 28 and the four transfer listed players, plus Elliott and Hatfield, are demoted to higher numbers. Paynter takes over the no. 9 shirt from last season's top scorer Jermaine Beckford while Schmeichel is made no. 1 with Collins, Sam and Bessone being handed numbers 5, 11 and 21 respectively.

=== August ===
- 17 August: The club are charged for failing to ensure their players conducted themselves in an orderly fashion after a mass brawl with the opposition players during the 1–1 draw with Nottingham Forest on 15 August. Forest are also charged with a three match ban being handed to their player Chris Gunter whose stamp on Leeds striker Sanchez Watt started the brawl.
- 18 August: Club chairman Ken Bates slams the charge on the club by The FA in regard to the Forest game, stating that the club will defend themselves and back up Watt. Meanwhile, it is revealed that the club spent £335,723 on agents fees during the 2009–10 season – the third highest in League One.
- 24 August: Leeds are fined £7,500 and Nottingham Forest £12,500 after the mass brawl during the match nine days ago.

=== November ===
- 18 November: Midfielder Bradley Johnson is put on the transfer list after rejecting a new contract.

=== December ===
- 10 December: Defender Jason Crowe is put on the transfer list after declining several loan offers from other clubs.

=== April ===
- 4 April: The club announce they have made a profit of £2.072 million in the 2009–10 financial year. It is also disclosed that the club's turnover increased by 16% to £27.446 million. In addition, it is noted that gate receipts totalled £11.732 million, rising 30.8% with merchandising increasing by 12% to £5.509 million. In their statement, it is revealed that the total wage bill of the playing and football management staff in the relevant financial year was £7.706 million with the value of the entire squad estimated at £6.667 million.

=== May ===
- 3 May: The club announce that on 26 April 2011, chairman Ken Bates became the controlling shareholder of the club after his company Outro Limited purchased Forward Sports Fund Limited, the company who own 72.85% (102,000,000 shares) of the shares in Leeds City Holdings Limited (L.C.H.) – the parent company of Leeds United Football Club Limited (the company that holds the share in the Football League, is a member of the West Riding County Football Association and an Associate Member of the FA) for an undisclosed fee. It is noted that the remaining 27.15% (approx. 38,013,727 shares) of shares in L.C.H. are owned by four unconnected shareholders, with none of them holding more than 10% of the shares.
- 6 May: The club plead guilty to the FA charge of "failing to ensure that their players conducted themselves in an orderly fashion and/or refrained from provocative behaviour" in regard to the mass brawl against Burnley six days ago
- 7 May: The club finish The Championship season in 7th place, thus missing out on the play-offs.
- 10 May: The FA fine both Leeds and Burnley £5,000 in relation to the brawl between their players in the April match. Leeds are fined an additional £7,500 as they had recently been found guilty of a separate improper conduct charge.

== Pre-season ==
13 July 2010	MFK Ružomberok	1–0	Leeds United	Ružomberok, Slovakia
17:30 BST	Chovanec 16'	(Report)		Stadium: MFK Ružomberok Stadium

16 July 2010	MFK Kosice	0–1	Leeds United	Košice, Slovakia
17:30 BST		(Report)	Paynter 57'	Stadium: Lokomotíva Stadium

20 July 2010	Bury	4–0	Leeds United	Bury
19:45 BST	Lowe 36'; Bishop 65', 89' (pen.); Carlton 85'	(Report)		Stadium: Gigg Lane; Attendance: 2,769; Referee: A. Penn

24 July 2010	Hartlepool United	0–5	Leeds United	Hartlepool
15:00 BST		(Report)	Snodgrass 5'; Becchio 40', 68'; Johnson 45'; Howson 57'	Stadium: Victoria Park; Attendance: 2,619; Referee: D. Webb

27 July 2010	SK Brann	1–3	Leeds United	Bergen, Norway
19:00 BST	Hansen 45'	(Report)	Becchio 18', 57'; Sam 25'	Stadium: Brann Stadion; Attendance: 5,400

31 July 2010	Leeds United	3–1	Wolverhampton Wanderers	Leeds
15:00 BST	Gradel 33'; Sam 49'; Johnson 85'	(Report)	Jarvis 45'	Stadium: Elland Road; Attendance: 12,979; Referee: N. Miller

== Competitions ==
=== Championship ===
==== Table ====
Pos	Team	Pld	W	D	L	GF	GA	GD	Pts	Promotion, qualification or relegation
5	Reading	46	20	17	9	77	51	+26	77	Qualification for Championship play-offs
6	Nottingham Forest	46	20	15	11	69	50	+19	75	Qualification for Championship play-offs
7	Leeds United	46	19	15	12	81	70	+11	72	
8	Burnley	46	18	14	14	65	61	+4	68	
9	Millwall	46	18	13	15	62	48	+14	67	

Updated to match(es) played on 7 May 2011. Source: The Football League
Rules for classification: 1) points; 2) goal difference; 3) number of goals scored.

==== Results summary ====
Overall								Home						Away					
Pld	W	D	L	GF	GA	GD	Pts	W	D	L	GF	GA	GD	W	D	L	GF	GA	GD
46	19	15	12	81	70	+11	72	11	8	4	47	34	+13	8	7	8	34	36	−2

Last updated: 7 May 2011.
Source: The Football League

==== Results by round ====
Round	1	2	3	4	5	6	7	8	9	10	11	12	13	14	15	16	17	18	19	20	21	22	23	24	25	26	27	28	29	30	31	32	33	34	35	36	37	38	39	40	41	42	43	44	45	46
Ground	H	A	H	A	H	A	A	H	H	A	A	H	H	A	A	H	H	A	A	H	A	H	A	H	H	A	H	A	A	H	A	H	H	A	H	A	H	A	H	A	A	H	H	A	H	A
Result	L	D	W	W	W	L	D	W	L	L	W	L	L	W	W	D	W	D	D	W	W	W	D	D	D	L	W	D	D	W	W	D	D	L	W	W	D	L	W	L	L	D	D	L	W	W
Position	16	16	9	6	5	9	12	5	10	10	9	10	16	12	8	8	5	5	7	6	4	2	3	4	4	5	5	5	6	6	6	6	6	6	6	5	5	5	5	6	6	6	7	9	7	7

Updated to match(es) played on 7 May 2011. Source: Competitive Matches
A = Away; H = Home; W = Win; D = Draw; L = Loss

==== Matches ====
7 August 2010	Leeds United	1–2	Derby County	Leeds
17:15 BST	Becchio 15'	(Report)	Hulse 13'; Commons 26' (pen.)	Stadium: Elland Road; Attendance: 26,761; Referee: N. Swarbrick

15 August 2010	Nottingham Forest	1–1	Leeds United	Nottingham
13:15 BST	Blackstock 9'	(Report)	Sam 37'	Stadium: City Ground; Attendance: 24,986; Referee: T. Bates

21 August 2010	Leeds United	3–1	Millwall	Leeds
12:30 BST	Sam 32'; Somma 79', 90+4'	(Report)	Naylor 15' (o.g.)	Stadium: Elland Road; Attendance: 25,067; Referee: C. Webster

28 August 2010	Watford	0–1	Leeds United	Watford
15:00 BST		(Report)	Naylor 6'	Stadium: Vicarage Road; Attendance: 14,039; Referee: J. Lingington

11 September 2010	Leeds United	2–1	Swansea City	Leeds
15:00 BST	Johnson 55'; Becchio 63'	(Report)	Dobbie 13'	Stadium: Elland Road; Attendance: 26,453; Referee: G. Hegley

14 September 2010	Barnsley	5–2	Leeds United	Barnsley
19:45 BST	O'Connor 42'; O'Brien 49'; Arismendi 65'; Collins 82' (o.g.); Hammill 83'	(Report)	Howson 3'; Somma 86'	Stadium: Oakwell; Attendance: 20,309; Referee: S. Tanner

17 September 2010	Doncaster Rovers	0–0	Leeds United	Doncaster
19:45 BST		(Report)		Stadium: Keepmoat; Attendance: 13,293; Referee: K. Woolmer

25 September 2010	Leeds United	1–0	Sheffield United	Leeds
15:00 BST	Johnson 83'; Snodgrass (red card) 88'	(Report)	Ward (red card) 90+2'	Stadium: Elland Road; Attendance: 33,622; Referee: A. Taylor

28 September 2010	Leeds United	4–6	Preston North End	Leeds
19:45 BST	Becchio 15'; Bruce 20'; Somma 27', 39'	Report)	Parkin 5', 40', 64'; Treacy 54'; Davidson 58' (pen.); Hume 79'	Stadium: Elland Road; Attendance: 22,727; Referee: N. Miller

2 October 2010	Ipswich Town	2–1	Leeds United	Ipswich
15:00 BST	Scotland 19'; Smith 83'	(Report)	Snodgrass 72'; Bruce (red card) 79'	Stadium: Portman Road; Attendance: 23,105; Referee: K. Hill

17 October 2010	Middlesbrough	1–2	Leeds United	Middlesbrough
17:20 BST	Boyd 53'	(Report)	Somma 12'; Becchio 63'	Stadium: Riverside; Attendance: 23,550; Referee: C. Foy

19 October 2010	Leeds United	1–2	Leicester City	Leeds
19:45 BST	Becchio 83'	(Report)	Naughton 63'; Howard 81'	Stadium: Elland Road; Attendance: 22,775; Referee: D. Whitestone

25 October 2010	Leeds United	0–4	Cardiff City	Leeds
19:45 BST		(Report)	Bothroyd 22', 56'; Chopra 51'; Naylor 60'	Stadium: Elland Road; Attendance: 20,747; Referee: M. Oliver

30 October 2010	Scunthorpe United	1–4	Leeds United	Scunthorpe
15:00 BST	Byrne 27'	(Report)	Gradel 8'; Howson 60', 74', 75'	Stadium: Glanford Park; Attendance: 8,122; Referee: R. Booth

6 November 2010	Coventry City	2–3	Leeds United	Coventry
15:00 GMT	Jutkiewicz 52'; Turner 64'	(Report)	Howson 4'; Snodgrass 40'; Gradel 61' (pen.)	Stadium: Ricoh Arena; Attendance: 28,184; Referee: K. Stroud

10 November 2010	Leeds United	2–2	Hull City	Leeds
19:45 GMT	Johnson 33'; O'Brien 71'	(Report)	Bostock 14'; Johnson 81' (o.g.); Bostock (red card) 77'	Stadium: Elland Road; Attendance: 24,906; Referee: K. Friend

13 November 2010	Leeds United	3–1	Bristol City	Leeds
15:00 GMT	Becchio 65', 69', 83'	(Report)	Stead 67'	Stadium: Elland Road; Attendance: 27,567; Referee: P. Crossley

20 November 2010	Norwich City	1–1	Leeds United	Norwich
15:00 GMT	Barnett 65'	(Report)	Gradel 13'	Stadium: Carrow Road; Attendance: 26,315; Referee: M. Russell

27 November 2010	Reading	0–0	Leeds United	Reading
15:00 GMT		(Report)		Stadium: Madjeski Stadium; Attendance: 23,677; Referee: F. Graham

4 December 2010	Leeds United	2–1	Crystal Palace	Leeds
15:00 GMT	Becchio 81', 83'	(Report)	Danns 44'	Stadium: Elland Road; Attendance: 25,476; Referee: A. Haines

11 December 2010	Burnley	2–3	Leeds United	Burnley
15:00 GMT	Easton 29'; Rodriguez 37'	(Report)	Gradel 52'; Becchio 66'; Howson 85'	Stadium: Turf Moor; Attendance: 20,453; Referee: R. Booth

18 December 2010	Leeds United	2–0	Queens Park Rangers	Leeds
15:00 GMT	Gradel 25', 70'	(Report)		Stadium: Elland Road; Attendance: 29,426; Referee: S. Mathieson

26 December 2010	Leicester City	2–2	Leeds United	Leicester
15:00 GMT	Gallagher 72' (pen.); King 76'	(Report)	Gradel 19'; Snodgrass 55'	Stadium: Walkers Stadium; Attendance: 30,919; Referee: R. Booth

28 December 2010	Leeds United	3–3	Portsmouth	Leeds
15:00 GMT	Gradel 7'; Howson 10'; Johnson 62'	(Report)	Nugent 33'; O'Brien 63', 90+3' (o.g.)	Stadium: Elland Road; Attendance: 31,556; Referee: D. Webb

1 January 2011	Leeds United	1–1	Middlesbrough	Leeds
13:00 GMT	Becchio 90+1'	(Report)	Wheater 20'	Stadium: Elland Road; Attendance: 30,452; Referee: C. Webster

4 January 2011	Cardiff City	2–1	Leeds United	Cardiff
19:45 GMT	Bellamy 11'; Chopra 79'	(Report)	Snodgrass 59'	Stadium: Cardiff City Stadium; Attendance: 25,010; Referee: A. D'Urso

15 January 2011	Leeds United	4–0	Scunthorpe United	Leeds
15:00 GMT	Watt 16'; Gradel 20'; Johnson 29'; Somma 88'	(Report)		Stadium: Elland Road; Attendance: 25,446; Referee: F. Graham

22 January 2011	Portsmouth	2–2	Leeds United	Portsmouth
15:00 GMT	Ward 26'; Utaka 61'	(Report)	Becchio 47'; Somma 63'	Stadium: Fratton Park; Attendance: 20,040; Referee: Taylor

1 February 2011	Hull City	2–2	Leeds United	Hull
19:45	Fryatt 33'; Chester 40'	(Report)	Snodgrass 44'; Somma 56'	Stadium: KC Stadium; Attendance: 24,110

5 February 2011	Leeds United	1–0	Coventry City	Leeds
15:00	Somma 56'	(Report)		Stadium: Elland Road; Attendance: 27,033

12 February 2011	Bristol City	0–2	Leeds United	Bristol
15:00		(Report)	Snodgrass 17'; Gradel 50'	Stadium: Ashton Gate; Attendance: 18,000

19 February 2011	Leeds United	2–2	Norwich City	Leeds
15:00	Becchio 16'; Somma 75'	(Report)	Lansbury 45+1'; Hoolahan 69'	Stadium: Elland Road; Attendance: 31,601

22 February 2011	Leeds United	3–3	Barnsley	Leeds
19:45	Becchio 23'; Gradel 37' (pen.), 70'; Johnson (red card) 52'	(Report)	Shackell 2'; Hill 48'; Trippier 82'	Stadium: Elland Road; Attendance: 26,289

26 February 2011	Swansea City	3–0	Leeds United	Swansea
12:45	Sinclair 13', 55' (pen.); Moore 72'	(Report)		Stadium: Liberty Stadium; Attendance: 19,309

5 March 2011	Leeds United	5–2	Doncaster Rovers	Leeds
15:00	Gradel 12', 83'; Howson 50', 90'; Becchio 75'	(Report)	Sharp 45+1'; Moussa 49'	Stadium: Elland Road; Attendance: 27,027

8 March 2011	Preston North End	1–2	Leeds United	Preston
19:45	Hume 63'	(Report)	Kilkenny 30'; Paynter 57'	Stadium: Deepdale; Attendance: 15,269

12 March 2011	Leeds United	0–0	Ipswich Town	Leeds
15:00		(Report)		Stadium: Elland Road; Attendance: 27,432

19 March 2011	Sheffield United	2–0	Leeds United	Sheffield
13:00	Lichaj 54' (o.g.); Riise 74'	(Report)	Paynter (red card) 88'	Stadium: Bramall Lane; Attendance: 23,728

2 April 2011	Leeds United	4–1	Nottingham Forest	Leeds
12:45 BST	Howson 51'; Becchio 58'; Gradel 73', 87'	(Report)	McCleary 65'; Cohen (red card) 36'	Stadium: Elland Road; Attendance: 29,524

9 April 2011	Millwall	3–2	Leeds United	London
15:00	Henry 24'; Trotter 30'; Morison 62'	(Report)	Becchio 51'; O'Brien 90+5'	Stadium: The Den; Attendance: 16,724

12 April 2011	Derby County	2–1	Leeds United	Derby
19:45	Ward 61'; B. Davies 63'	(Report)	Gradel 58'	Stadium: Pride Park; Attendance: 27,252

16 April 2011	Leeds United	2–2	Watford	Leeds
15:00	Becchio 72'; Deeney 88' (o.g.)	(Report)	Hodson 78'; Weimann 86'	Stadium: Elland Road; Attendance: 30,240

22 April 2011	Leeds United	0–0	Reading	Leeds
19:45		(Report)		Stadium: Elland Road; Attendance: 24,564

25 April 2011	Crystal Palace	1–0	Leeds United	London
15:00	Danns 2', (red card) 90+7'	(Report)		Stadium: Selhurst Park; Attendance: 20,142

30 April 2011	Leeds United	1–0	Burnley	Leeds
12:45	McCormack 33'	(Report)		Stadium: Elland Road; Attendance: 31,186

7 May 2011	Queens Park Rangers	1–2	Leeds United	London
12:45	Helguson 1'	(Report)	Gradel 38'; McCormack 68'	Stadium: Loftus Road; Attendance: 18,234

=== FA Cup ===
8 January 2011 Third round	Arsenal	1–1	Leeds United	London
12:45 GMT	Fàbregas 90' (pen.)	(Report)	Snodgrass 55'	Stadium: Emirates Stadium; Attendance: 59,520; Referee: H. Webb

19 January 2011 Third round replay	Leeds United	1–3	Arsenal	Leeds
20:00 GMT	Johnson 37'	(Report)	Nasri 5'; Sagna 35'; Van Persie 76'	Stadium: Elland Road; Attendance: 38,232; Referee: M. Dean

=== League Cup ===
10 August 2010 First round	Leeds United	4–0	Lincoln City	Leeds
19:45 BST	Howson 2'; Becchio 7'; Sam 29'; Kilkenny 71' (pen.)	(Report)		Stadium: Elland Road; Attendance: 12,602; Referee: P. Tierney

24 August 2010 Second round	Leeds United	1–2	Leicester City	Leeds
19:45 BST	Somma 32'	(Report)	Wellens 66'; Howard 89' (pen.)	Stadium: Elland Road; Attendance: 16,509; Referee: E. Ilderton

== First-team squad ==
=== Squad information ===
N	Pos.	Nat.	Name	Age	Since	App	Goals	Ends	Transfer fee	Notes
1	GK	(Denmark)	Kasper Schmeichel	24	2010	40	0	2012	Free	
2	DF	(England)	Paul Connolly	27	2010	33	0	2013	Free	
3	DF	(Australia)	Patrick Kisnorbo	30	2009	36	1	2011	Free	
4	DF	(England)	Alex Bruce	26	2010	26	1	2012	£300k	
6	DF	(England)	Richard Naylor (captain)	34	2009	76	4	2011	Free	
7	MF	(Ivory Coast)	Max Gradel^{1}	23	2009	79	24	2012	£250k	
8	MF	(Australia) (England)	Neil Kilkenny	25	2008	144	11	2011	£150k	
9	FW	(England)	Billy Paynter	26	2010	23	1	2013	Free	
10	FW	(Argentina)	Luciano Becchio	27	2008	147	56	2014	£300k	
11	MF	(Ghana) (England)	Lloyd Sam	26	2010	20	3	2012	Free	
12	GK	(England)	Shane Higgs	34	2009	29	0	2011	Free	
13	FW	(United States)	Mike Grella	24	2009	42	5	2012	Free	
14	MF	(England)	Jonathan Howson (VC)	23	2006	203	28	2012	Youth system	
15	MF	(England)	Adam Clayton	22	2010	4	0	2013	Undisclosed	
16	MF	(England)	Bradley Johnson	24	2008	140	17	2011	£250k	
17	MF	(England)	Jake Livermore	21	2011	5	0	2011	Loan	
18	MF	(England)	Sanchez Watt	20	2010	33	1	2011	Loan	
19	DF	(England)	Ben Parker	23	2007	54	1	2012	Youth system	
20	DF	(United States)	Eric Lichaj	22	2011	16	0	2011	Loan	
21	DF	(Argentina)	Federico Bessone	27	2010	8	0	2013	Free	
22	GK	(Colombia)	David González	28	2011	0	0	2011	Loan	
23	FW	(Scotland)	Robert Snodgrass	23	2008	145	28	2013	£35k	
26	DF	(England)	Leigh Bromby	30	2009	52	1	2013	£250k	
27	FW	(South Africa)	Davide Somma	26	2009	34	12	2014	Free	
29	DF	(Northern Ireland)	George McCartney	30	2010	32	0	2011	Loan	
32	DF	(England)	Aidan White	19	2008	26	0	2012	Youth system	
33	MF	(Honduras)	Ramón Núñez	25	2010	2	0	2011	Free	
36	DF	(England)	Tom Lees	20	2008	0	0	2013	Youth system	
37	MF	(England)	Will Hatfield	19	2009	0	0	2011	Youth system	
40	DF	(Republic of Ireland) (England)	Andy O'Brien	31	2010	31	2	2010	Undisclosed	
44	FW	(Scotland)	Ross McCormack	24	2010	21	2	2013	£350k	

- Last updated: 7 May 2011
- Source: Wikipedia players' articles, Leeds United, Sky Sports
- Ordered by Squad Number.

Appearances (starts and substitute appearances) and goals include those in The Championship (and playoffs), League One (and playoffs), FA Cup, League Cup and Football League Trophy.
^{1}Player first came to the club on loan and was transferred the following year.

=== Squad stats ===
				Total				Championship		FA Cup		Football League Cup		
N	Pos.	Name	Nat.	GS	App	Gls	Min	App	Gls	App	Gls	App	Gls	Notes
1	GK	Kasper Schmeichel	(Denmark)	40	40		3800	37		2		1		
2	RB	Paul Connolly	(England)	34	34		3150	30		2		2		
3	CB	Patrick Kisnorbo	(Australia)		1		13	1						
4	CB	Alex Bruce	(Republic of Ireland) (England)	25	25	1	2176	21	1	2		2		1 start as RB
5	CB	Neill Collins	(Scotland)	22	23		2083	21				2		
6	CB	Richard Naylor	(England)	13	15	1	1232	15	1					
7	LW	Max Gradel	(Ivory Coast)	41	44	18	3611	41	18	2		1		7 starts as RW; 1 start as FW
8	CM	Neil Kilkenny	(Australia) (England)	31	39	2	2972	37	1			2	1	
9	FW	Billy Paynter	(England)	9	23	1	869	22	1	1				
10	FW	Luciano Becchio	(Argentina)	37	44	20	3325	41	19	1		2	1	
11	LW	Lloyd Sam	(England)	8	20	3	846	18	2	1		1	1	4 starts as RW
12	GK	Shane Higgs	(England)	7	7		627	6				1		
13	FW	Mike Grella	(United States)		2		37	1				1		
14	AM	Jonathan Howson	(England)	50	50	11	4628	46	10	2		2	1	1 start as RM
15	CM	Adam Clayton	(England)		4		58	4						
16	CM	Bradley Johnson	(England)	44	49	6	4194	45	5	2	1	2		10 starts as LM
17	DM	Amdy Faye	(Ghana)	6	8		454	8						
17	AM	Jake Livermore	(England)	4	5		253	5						
18	LW	Sanchez Watt	(England)	12	26	1	1152	22	1	2		2		3 starts as FW; 2 starts as RW
19	LB	Ben Parker	(England)	3	4		302	2		2				
20	RB	Jason Crowe	(England)											
20	RB	Eric Lichaj	(United States)	16	16		1512	16						4 starts as LB
21	LB	Federico Bessone	(Argentina)	8	8		642	6				2		
22	RB	Andrew Hughes	(England)	5	13		648	10		1		2		
23	RW	Robert Snodgrass	(Scotland)	37	40	7	3293	38	6	2	1			
24	CB	Ľubomír Michalík	(Slovakia)											
25	GK	Alan Martin	(Scotland)											
25	CM	Barry Bannan	(Scotland)	3	7		319	7						
26	CB	Leigh Bromby	(England)	9	15		1021	13		2				
27	FW	Davide Somma	(South Africa)	13	32	12	1475	29	11	2		1	1	
28	LW	Andy Robinson	(England)											
29	LB	George McCartney	(Northern Ireland)	32	32		2940	32						
30	GK	Jason Brown	(Wales) (England)	3	4		317	4						
31	GK	Ben Alnwick	(England)											
32	LW	Aidan White	(England)	1	3		151	2				1		
33	AM	Ramón Núñez	(Honduras)		2		49	2						
34	LB	Alan Sheehan	(Republic of Ireland)											
35	FW	Tom Elliott	(England)											
36	CB	Tom Lees	(England)											
37	CM	Will Hatfield	(England)											
38	RB	Liam Darville	(England)											
40	CB	Andy O'Brien	(Republic of Ireland) (England)	31	32	2	2999	30	2	2				
44	FW	Ross McCormack	(Scotland)	6	21	2	795	21	2					

Last updated: 7 May 2011
Source: Leeds United
Ordered by Squad Numbers
0 shown as blank

=== Disciplinary record ===
N	Pos.	Nat.	Name	Yellow card	Second yellow card	Red card	Notes
16	CM	(England)	Johnson	12	1		
2	CB	(England)	Connolly	10			
8	CM	(Australia) (England)	Kilkenny	8			
29	LB	(Northern Ireland)	McCartney	7			
14	CM	(England)	Howson	6			
40	CB	(Republic of Ireland) (England)	O'Brien	6			
10	FW	(Argentina)	Becchio	5			
6	CB	(England)	Naylor	5			
23	RW	(Scotland)	Snodgrass	4	1		
4	CB	(England)	Bruce	4	1		
5	CB	(Scotland)	Collins	3			
7	LW	(Ivory Coast)	Gradel	3			
1	GK	(Denmark)	Schmeichel	3			
9	FW	(England)	Paynter	1		1	
26	CB	(England)	Bromby	2			
22	RB	(England)	Hughes	2			
20	RB	(United States)	Lichaj	2			
18	LW	(England)	Watt	2			
30	GK	(Wales) (England)	Brown	1			
17	DM	(Senegal)	Faye	1			
17	CM	(England)	Livermore	1			
19	LB	(England)	Parker	1			

Last updated: 30 April 2011
Source: BBC Sport
Only competitive matches
(yellow card) = Number of bookings; (second yellow card) = Number of sending offs after a second yellow card; (red card) = Number of sending offs by a direct red card.

==== Suspensions ====
No.	P	Name	No. Matches; Banned	Reason for Suspension	Notes	Source
7	LW	Gradel	4	Red card (violent conduct)	Suspension received in the final game of the 2009–10 season.	
27	FW	Somma	3	Red card (violent conduct)	Suspension received in the final game of the 2009–10 season while on loan at Lincoln City.	
23	RW	Snodgrass	1	Red card (two yellow cards)		
4	CB	Bruce	1	Red card (two yellow cards)		
2	RB	Connolly	1	Five yellow cards		
16	CM	Johnson	1	Red card (two yellow cards)		
9	FW	Paynter	3	Red card (violent conduct)		

Ordered by date of suspension handed.

=== International call-ups ===
No.	P	Name	Country	Level	Caps	Goals	Notes	Source
7	LW	Gradel	Ivory Coast	Full	0	0		
8	CM	Kilkenny	Australia	Full	5	0	Missed all of January to play in the 2011 AFC Asian Cup	
14	CM	Howson	England	Under-21s	1	0		
20	RB	Lichaj	USA	Full	1	0		
23	RW	Snodgrass	Scotland	Full	2	0		
25	CM	Bannan	Scotland	Full	1	0		
27	FW	Somma	South Africa	Full	2	1		
33	AM	Núñez	Honduras	Full	5	2		

Ordered by squad number.
Does not include appearances and goals made prior to the 2010–11 season or prior to joining the club.

== Transfers ==
=== In ===
No.	Pos.	Nat.	Name	Age	EU	Moving from	Type	Transfer window	Ends	Transfer fee	Source
1	GK	(Denmark)	Kasper Schmeichel	23	EU	Notts County	Free Agent	Summer	2012	Free	
9	FW	(England)	Billy Paynter	25	EU	Swindon Town	Free Agent	Summer	2013	Free	
2	DF	(England)	Paul Connolly	26	EU	Derby County	Free Agent	Summer	2013	Free	
21	DF	(Argentina)	Federico Bessone	26	EU	Swansea City (Wales)	Free Agent	Summer	2013	Free	
5	DF	(Scotland)	Neill Collins	26	EU	Preston North End	Transferred	Summer	2013	£500k	
11	MF	(England)	Lloyd Sam	25	EU	Charlton Athletic	Free Agent	Summer	2012^{1}	Free	
4	DF	(England)	Alex Bruce	25	EU	Ipswich Town	Transferred	Summer	2012^{1}	undisclosed	
44	FW	(Scotland)	Ross McCormack	24	EU	Cardiff City (Wales)	Transferred	Summer	2013	£350k^{2}	
33	MF	(Honduras)	Ramón Núñez	24	Non-EU	Olimpia (Honduras)	Free Agent	Summer	2011	Free	
15	MF	(England)	Adam Clayton	21	EU	Manchester City	Transferred	Summer	2013	Undisclosed	
17	MF	(Senegal)	Amdy Faye	33	Non-EU	Stoke City	Free Agent	Summer	2011	Free	
—	GK	(Trinidad and Tobago) (England)	Tony Warner	36	EU	Charlton Athletic	Free Agent	Summer	2010^{3}	Free	
40	DF	(Republic of Ireland) (England)	Andy O'Brien	31	EU	Bolton Wanderers	Transferred	Winter	2013	Undisclosed	
TBA	MF	(England)	Zac Thompson	18	EU	Everton	Free Agent	Winter	2011	Free	

Note: Bessone is EU national as he holds an Italian passport.
^{1}Contract includes an optional one-year extension clause.
^{2}Although officially undisclosed, it was reported by Vital Football that the fee was £400,000.
^{3}Player joined the club on a non-contract basis with selection eligibility for the reserve team only. Warner only played one game before moving on to Scunthorpe United. It was rumoured that Warner rejected a six-month contract with the club.

=== Loans in ===
No.	Pos.	Name	Country	Age	Loan club	Started	Ended	Start source	End source
18	MF	Sanchez Watt	(England)	35	Arsenal	3 Aug	7 May		
15	MF	Adam Clayton	(England)	21	Manchester City	6 Aug	31 Aug		
30	GK	Jason Brown	(Wales) (England)	28	Blackburn Rovers	11 Sep	15 Nov		
29	DF	George McCartney	(Northern Ireland)	29	Sunderland	23 Sep	28 Dec		
—	GK	Deale Chamberlain	(England)	18	Liverpool	2 Oct	31 Oct		
31	GK	Ben Alnwick	(England)	23	Tottenham Hotspur	15 Oct	28 Oct^{1}		
40	DF	Andy O'Brien	(Republic of Ireland) (England)	31	Bolton Wanderers	29 Oct	4 Jan		
29	DF	George McCartney	(Northern Ireland)	45	Sunderland	14 Jan	7 May		
22	GK	David González	(Colombia)	44	Manchester City	31 Jan	7 May		
20	DF	Eric Lichaj	(United States)	38	Aston Villa	9 Feb	7 May		
25	MF	Barry Bannan	(Scotland)	21	Aston Villa	7 Mar	28 Apr		
17	MF	Jake Livermore	(England)	37	Tottenham Hotspur	24 Mar	7 May		

Sources: For loan start source see "Start source". For loan end source see "End source".
EU = if holds or not a European Union passport; Country: when 2 flags, 1st flag = country that plays for internationally, 2nd flag = country of birth; No. = number on jersey; P = Position (for position name, pause mouse pointer on abbreviation); Name = Name on jersey (for more extensive name, pause mouse pointer on name); In/Out = In: The player came in on loan, Out: The player went out on loan; Loan club = the club that the player moved on loan to or the club that the player came from on loan; Started = the date when the player's loan started; Ended = the date when the player's loan ended.

^{1}Manager Simon Grayson confirmed in an interview with LUTV that Alnwick returned to Tottenham Hotspur after the behind-closed-doors match against Sunderland due to a thigh strain.

=== Loans out ===
No.	Pos.	Name	Country	Age	Loan club	Started	Ended	Start source	End source
35	FW	Tom Elliott	(England)	20	Rotherham United	15 Jul	3 Jan		
36	DF	Tom Lees	(England)	35	Bury	30 Jul	7 May		
25	GK	Alan Martin	(Scotland)	22	Barrow	4 Aug	4 Jan		
37	DF	Liam Darville	(England)	20	Tranmere Rovers	5 Aug	1 Jan		
24	DF	Ľubomír Michalík	(Slovakia)	27	Carlisle United	31 Aug	1 Jan		
13	FW	Mike Grella	(United States)	23	Carlisle United	12 Oct	1 Jan		
32	DF	Aidan White	(England)	35	Oldham Athletic	18 Nov	7 May^{1}		
15	MF	Adam Clayton	(England)	22	Peterborough United	19 Nov	25 Jan		
37	MF	Will Hatfield	(England)	35	York City	28 Jan	7 May		
21	DF	Federico Bessone	(Argentina)	42	Charlton Athletic	31 Jan	7 May		
13	FW	Mike Grella	(United States)	39	Swindon Town	24 Feb	9 Apr		
15	MF	Adam Clayton	(England)	37	MK Dons	24 Mar			
33	MF	Ramón Núñez	(England)	41	Scunthorpe United	24 Mar	7 May		

Sources: For loan start source see "Start source". For loan end source see "End source".
EU = if holds or not a European Union passport; Country: when 2 flags, 1st flag = country that plays for internationally, 2nd flag = country of birth; No. = number on jersey; P = Position (for position name, pause mouse pointer on abbreviation); Name = Name on jersey (for more extensive name, pause mouse pointer on name); In/Out = In: The player came in on loan, Out: The player went out on loan; Loan club = the club that the player moved on loan to or the club that the player came from on loan; Started = the date when the player's loan started; Ended = the date when the player's loan ended.

^{1}The player returned to the club on 1 January following his first loan spell and returned to Oldham Athletic on 27 January with a deal lasting until the end of the season.

=== Out ===
No.	Pos.	Name	Country	Age	Type	Moving to	Transfer window	Transfer fee	Apps	Goals	Source
9	FW	Jermaine Beckford	(England)	26	Released	Everton	Summer	n/a	152	85	
7	FW	Paul Dickov	(Scotland)	37	Out of Contract	Oldham Athletic	Summer	n/a	4	0	
1	GK	Casper Ankergren	(Denmark)	30	Out of Contract	Brighton & Hove Albion	Summer	n/a	143	0	
5	DF	Rui Marques	(Angola)	32	Out of Contract		Summer	n/a	100	4	
34	GK	Ryan Jones	(England)	18	Out of Contract	Rochdale	Summer	n/a	0	0	
—	DF	Andrew Milne	(Scotland)	18	Out of Contract	Barrow	Summer	n/a	0	0	
—	MF	Sam Jones	(Wales)	18	Out of Contract		Summer	n/a	0	0	
—	FW	Adam Watson	(England)	18	Out of Contract		Summer	n/a	0	0	
—	FW	Mike Whitwell	(England)	18	Out of Contract		Summer	n/a	0	0	
—	FW	Callum Williams	(England)	18	Out of Contract		Summer	n/a	0	0	
33^{1}	FW	Tresor Kandol	(Democratic Republic of the Congo) (Zaire)	28	Released	Albacete (Spain)	Summer	n/a	79	16	
34	DF	Alan Sheehan	(Republic of Ireland)	23	Released	Swindon Town	Summer	n/a	24	2	
28	MF	Andy Robinson	(England)	31	Released	Tranmere Rovers	Winter	n/a	50	7	
17	MF	Amdy Faye	(Senegal)	33	Out of Contract		Winter	n/a	8	0	
24	DF	Ľubomír Michalík	(Slovakia)	27	Released	Carlisle United	Winter	n/a	76	2	
38	DF	Liam Darville	(England)	20	Released	York City	Winter	n/a	0	0	
22	DF	Andy Hughes	(England)	33	Transferred	Scunthorpe United	Winter	Free	139	1	
20	DF	Jason Crowe	(England)	48	Released	Leyton Orient	Winter	n/a	27	2	
25	GK	Alan Martin	(Scotland)	22	Released	Ayr United (Scotland)	Winter	n/a	0	0	
38	FW	Tom Elliott	(England)	20	Released	Hamilton Academical (Scotland)	Winter	n/a	4	0	
5	DF	Neill Collins	(Scotland)	27	Transferred^{1}	Sheffield United	Winter	Undisclosed	32	0	

EU = if holds or not a European Union passport; Country: when 2 flags, 1st flag = country that plays for internationally, 2nd flag = country of birth; N = number on jersey; P = Position (for position name, pause mouse pointer on abbreviation); Name = Name on jersey (for more extensive name, pause mouse pointer on name); Age = age on the day of the signing; Moving from = only indicate the club the player was playing before start playing for this club in this season, for the type of the moving see Status column; Moving to = only indicates the club the player is going to play next, for the type of the moving see Status column; Ends = when the player's current contract ends; n/a = Not applicable.

^{1}Kandol finished the 2009–10 season with the shirt number 20, however was absent during the 2010–11 season shirt number announcement with Jason Crowe taking his number. Kandol was last seen wearing the number 33 shirt during pre-season training.
^{2}It has been confirmed that the fee paid by Sheffield United was higher than the £500k that Leeds paid for Collins in the summer to Preston.

=== New Contracts ===
No.	Pos.	Nat.	Name	Age	Status	Contract length	Expiry date	Source
14	MF	(England)	Jonathan Howson	21	Signed	1 year	May 2012	
22	DF	(England)	Andrew Hughes	32	Signed	1 year	June 2011	
9	FW	(England)	Jermaine Beckford	26	Rejected	3 years	n/a	
27	FW	(South Africa)	Davide Somma	25	Signed	3 years	Nov 2013	
16	MF	(England)	Bradley Johnson	23	Rejected	Unknown	n/a	
36	DF	(England)	Tom Lees	20	Signed	2 1/2 years	Jun 2013	
10	FW	(Argentina)	Luciano Becchio	26	Signed	3 1/2 years	Jun 2014	
33	MF	(Honduras)	Ramón Núñez	25	Signed	6 months^{1}	Jun 2011	

^{1}The contract includes the option to extend the contract by a further year.

== Awards ==
=== Internal Awards ===
==== Official Player of the Year Awards ====
The results of the 2010–11 Leeds United A.F.C. Player of the Year Awards were announced at a dinner on 30 April 2011 at Elland Road.

- Player of the Year: Max Gradel
- Young Player of the Year: Jonny Howson
- Players' Player of the Year: Max Gradel
- Goal of the Season: Bradley Johnson (vs Arsenal, 19 January)
- Best Contribution to Community: Jonny Howson
- Chairman's Special Award: Harvey Sharman (Head Physiotherapist)

=== External Awards ===
==== Championship Team of the Week ====
The following Leeds players have been selected in the official Championship team of the week.

- 31 August: Kasper Schmeichel
- 27 September: Bradley Johnson
- 18 October: Luciano Becchio
- 1 November: Jonathan Howson, Andy O'Brien
- 8 November: Robert Snodgrass
- 15 November: Luciano Becchio
- 22 November: Max Gradel
- 6 December: Robert Snodgrass, Luciano Becchio
- 13 December: Jonathan Howson
- 20 December: Kasper Schmeichel, Robert Snodgrass, Max Gradel
- 14 February: Eric Lichaj, Robert Snodgrass, Max Gradel
- 21 February: Robert Snodgrass
- 7 March: Jonathan Howson, Max Gradel
- 4 April: Leigh Bromby, Max Gradel

=== Other ===
- PFA Fans' Player of the Month (The Championship): Luciano Becchio (November), Robert Snodgrass (January, February), Jonny Howson (April)
- LMA Manager of the Month (The Championship): Simon Grayson (December)
- FA Cup Player of the Round: Kasper Schmeichel (3rd round)
