= Davide Somma =

South African soccer player (born 1985)

Personal information
- Full name: Davide Enrico Somma
- Date of birth: 26 March 1985 (age 41)
- Place of birth: Johannesburg, South Africa
- Height: 6 ft 3 in (1.91 m)
- Position: Striker

Team information
- Current team: Long Island United (Junior Coach)

Youth career
- 2004: Tyler Apaches
- 2004: Logroñés

Senior career*
Years	Team	Apps	(Gls)
2004–2005	Perugia	0	(0)
2005–2007	Pro Vasto	39	(2)
2007–2008	Olbia	14	(1)
2008–2009	San Jose Earthquakes	4	(0)
2009–2013	Leeds United	33	(12)
2009–2010	→ Chesterfield (loan)	3	(0)
2010	→ Lincoln City (loan)	14	(9)
Total		107	(24)

International career
2010–2011	South Africa	3	(1)
- * Club domestic league appearances and goals

Davide Enrico Somma (born 26 March 1985) is a South African former soccer player who played as a striker. He played for the South Africa national team as a striker and his most notable spell was at Leeds United. In November 2010 Somma made his debut for the South Africa national side against United States. He now works as a Junior Coach for Long Island United. Somma also serves as the men’s club soccer coach for Stony Brook University.

== Career ==
=== Youth and college ===
Born in Johannesburg, South Africa, Somma started playing football at the age of five for the Edenvale Football Club in his native Johannesburg. After moving to the United States with his family when he was 12, he attended Riverview High School in Sarasota, Florida, and played club soccer with the Sarasota Storm and St. Pete Raiders.

He played one year of college soccer at Tyler Junior College in 2004, scoring 13 goals and registering nine assists, and being named to the National Junior College Athletic Association (NJCAA) Region XIV first team. After one season with Tyler, Somma enrolled at Edukick (great camp), an international soccer school program, and joined the youth system of the Spanish team Logroñés, his Italian passport giving him the opportunity to pursue a career in Europe.

=== Professional ===
==== Italy ====
Somma signed a four-year contract with Italian Serie A club Perugia in 2004. However, Somma never played a game for the team as Perugia's president bankrupted the club and it folded six months later. Somma transferred to Pro Vasto, and played 39 games for the team between 2005 and 2007. He later played for Olbia before returning to the United States in 2008.

==== Major League Soccer ====
Somma signed a developmental contract with the San Jose Earthquakes of Major League Soccer in September 2008 along with Michael Ghebru and made three regular season appearances for the club during the 2008 season, in addition to five reserve team appearances in which he notched two goals and three assists.

In December 2008 he joined the Generation Adidas team in London for a three-game tour of England and scored two goals for the squad as they faced the reserve teams of Reading, Chelsea, and West Ham United. In February 2009, Somma signed a senior contract with the San Jose Earthquakes, but was placed on waivers on 26 May.

Whilst at San Jose, he was a teammate of former Leeds United player Darren Huckerby, who encouraged Somma to find a new club in England.

=== Leeds United ===
In July 2009, Somma took part in a trial with Queens Park Rangers and played in a pre-season fixture as a winger. After his trial at QPR, Somma took part in a trial at Leeds United, and earned an extended spell at the club. He scored in a pre-season friendly against Newport County and also scored in friendlies against Newcastle United and Hull City, and signed a permanent contract with the club in September 2009 on a one-year deal, with an option in the club's favour to extend the contract for a further season.

In signing for Leeds, Somma became the fifth South African to play for Leeds following Gerry Francis, Albert Johanneson, Lucas Radebe and Phil Masinga. In an LUTV interview, Somma said that, due to his Italian heritage, he and teammate Mike Grella can speak to each other in Italian. Somma made his debut for Leeds in a reserve game against Rotherham United, and marked the game by scoring two goals.

Somma was named in the Leeds squad for the Football League Trophy game against Darlington, and made his debut when he came on as a second-half substitute. His debut ended prematurely when he suffered a hamstring injury, which meant Leeds had to play the rest of the game with 10 men having used all their substitutions. After working his way back from injury and scoring regularly in the reserves, Somma returned to the Leeds first team squad when he was named as a substitute for a game against Leyton Orient on 23 November 2009.

On 26 November, Somma joined Chesterfield on loan until January 2010. Somma was given squad number 32, and made his Football League debut for the team on 2 December, starting a game against Crewe Alexandra. Somma had a penalty saved by Crewe goalkeeper Steve Phillips on his debut. Somma missed a number of Chesterfield's games through injury. After Somma's one-month loan spell expired on 5 January 2010, he returned to Leeds. He immediately returned to a Leeds first team squad when he was named on the bench in the FA Cup replay against Tottenham Hotspur.

After impressing whilst out on loan to Lincoln, Somma was handed a new one-year extension to his contract at Leeds.

==== Lincoln City loan ====
On 25 February 2010, Somma joined Chris Sutton's Lincoln City on a month's loan to gain some more first -team experience and scored on his debut against Crewe Alexandra two days later. His second goal came against Hereford United. Somma's third goal came against Dagenham & Redbridge in the 1–1 draw.

His fourth and fifth goals came in the same game against Torquay United, with Somma scoring a brace which helped earn a 3–2 win for Lincoln. He had scored five goals in five games during his loan spell, and thus became Lincoln's top goal scorer for the entire season. On 23 March 2010, City extended the loan of Somma until the end of the season. Somma scored a brace against Bournemouth taking his tally to seven goals in nine games for Lincoln. Later he scored his eighth of the season against Bury to secure Lincoln's survival in League Two for another year.

Somma then made it nine goals in 13 matches scoring Lincoln's only goal in a 3–1 defeat away at Aldershot Town. He was given a red card for violent conduct in his final game for Lincoln City. After the match, his loan spell expired and he ended the season as Lincoln's top goal scorer with nine goals. He also came third in Lincoln's player of the season awards. Manager Chris Sutton said after Somma's loan spell that he would love to bring Somma back to the club on a permanent deal if he was not in Leeds' first team plans.

==== Return to Leeds United ====
===== 2010–11 season =====
Somma returned to Leeds United after his spell at Lincoln ended. Despite Somma's missing the first three competitive games of the season after his red card for Lincoln in the last game of the 2009–10 season, Simon Grayson has said Somma is part of his plans and will not be going out on loan for the 2010–11 season.

Following his suspension, Somma was available to return to the Leeds side against Millwall, and duly scored twice on his league debut after coming on as a 75th-minute substitute, as Leeds won 3–1. Somma claimed after his debut that he could replace Jermaine Beckford and score the goals the departed hitman previously scored for Leeds. He came into the starting line-up for the following match against Leicester City in the League Cup, scoring his third goal in two games. In his fourth game of the season, he scored his fourth goal of the season in the 5–2 defeat against Barnsley, with Somma scoring a late consolation goal for Leeds.

Somma's first league start for Leeds came in the match against Doncaster Rovers, Somma received the man of the match award after putting in an impressive performance where he hit the crossbar and also had a goal ruled out for offside. Somma scored his fifth and sixth goals of the season against Preston North End. He scored his seventh goal of the season with a left footed volley against Middlesbrough. In November 2010, Somma entered contract negotiations with Leeds over extending his contract, signing a three-year deal on 9 November. In December 2010, after reports circulated in South Africa that Somma had joined Swansea City on loan, Leeds denied the story and said that it was totally incorrect. After a spell out of the side, Somma came on as a substitute on 8 January against Arsenal. Leeds were 1–0 up when Robert Snodgrass scored a second half penalty, Arsenal equalised in the 90th minute when Cesc Fàbregas scored a penalty.

He came on as a second-half substitute against Scunthorpe United and scored his eighth goal of the season for Leeds. Seconds after coming on against Arsenal in the FA Cup replay, Somma nearly scored but instead put his shot wide of the goal. Somma scored his ninth goal of the season with his first touch of the ball after coming on as a substitute against Portsmouth. On 1 February, Somma made his first start since the 8 November and marked it with his 10th goal of the season against Hull City. Somma scored his 11th goal of the season against Coventry City. Somma continued his reputation as a super-sub when he scored his 12th goal of the season with his first touch versus Norwich City.

The phonetic similarities between his surname "Somma" and the season Summer led to the terrace chant parody of the Mungo Jerry song "In the Summertime".

===== 2011–12 season =====
On 15 July 2011, Somma revealed via his Twitter page that he had torn his anterior cruciate ligaments during pre-season training and would be out for at least six months. After Somma revealed via Twitter the severity of his injury, manager Simon Grayson banned all Leeds United players' Twitter accounts.

Somma returned to light training during mid-December, stepping up his recovery from his cruciate ligament injury, meaning the player's recovery was well in front of schedule.

===== 2012–13 season =====
Leeds manager Neil Warnock said on 3 May that he hoped that Somma could return from injury during the 2012 pre-season and that he was looking forward to working with him upon his long-awaited return. Somma returned to light training for Leeds during September, It was revealed that Leeds were also looking to get Somma back playing reserve team matches to gain fitness from October onwards in the hope of him returning to the first team. Somma was set to play for Leeds' Under 21 Development Squad in December, however his playing comeback was delayed when two matches were postponed due to adverse weather conditions.

Somma was named in a Leeds United squad for the first time since the final day of the 2010–11 season when he was named on the bench for the League Cup tie against Chelsea on 19 December 2012. Somma was also allocated the number 28 shirt for the season. Somma made his first team return as a second-half substitute in Leeds 2-1 victory against Middlesbrough on 22 December. Somma scored his first goal in only his second comeback appearance with a consolation goal in a 4-2 loss against Nottingham Forest on 26 December.

Somma suffered a setback from his knee injury in February 2013, with manager Neil Warnock revealing Somma had come back too quickly and that he would scale down his training.

Somma returned to full training in April 2013, and revealed that he would be available to take part in Leeds' final 5 games of the season under new manager Brian McDermott. Somma returned to the Leeds team in Brian McDermott's first game in charge when he was named on the bench on 13 April against Sheffield Wednesday. Somma made his playing return as a substitute against Burnley F.C., however his return was short lived when it was revealed Somma had damaged his knee cartilage and required an operation. The latest setback put Somma's future at the club in doubt with his contract set to expire in June.

Following the expiry of Somma's contract in the summer of 2013, the South African was released from Leeds, however he was due to return to the club for pre-season training with the aim of proving his fitness and earning a new contract, however Somma decided against returning.

=== Post Leeds ===
After being without a club since leaving Leeds and almost 'unofficially' retired from playing, Somma became a Junior Coach at Long Island United.

In February 2017, Somma tried to make a playing comeback when he and Striker Robbie Findley had a trial at MLS club New York Red Bulls, however both were unsuccessful with the trial and left the club on 15 February 2017.

== International ==
Somma was eligible to play for his home country South Africa and Italy due to his heritage. Somma also expressed desire to play for USA but was not yet eligible. However ex-Leeds captain Lucas Radebe confirmed that Somma told him he wanted to play for South Africa (Bafana Bafana).

In October 2010, new South Africa manager, Pitso Mosimane singled out Somma for special praise after impressing at Leeds United. Mosimane said; "We have good players playing in Europe and we have other players that we haven't called up. There is a striker who is constantly scoring goals, Davide Somma. He is busy scoring and I'm monitoring that. I'm monitoring whether he can add value to our team… it is not because he plays overseas" after mentioning a planned trip to Europe to take a closer look at some of these players.

Mosimane claimed in November 2010, that Somma might be called up for Bafana Bafana's friendly against USA on 17 November, in Cape Town On 10 November, Somma was named in South Africa's squad for the first time for the friendly against USA. He responded to the opportunity by saying, "I want to score goals, that is what feels good for me. I want to destroy them (the USA). . . . I wanted to play for them, but nothing ever happened so I just want to do it against them tomorrow."

On 17 November 2010, Somma made his debut for Bafana Bafana against USA, wearing the number 19 shirt. South Africa lost the game 1–0, with man of the match Brad Guzan keeping a clean sheet for the US. Somma was kept relatively quiet, although he provided a through ball in the first half to create one of South Africa's best chances of the match. Somma was substituted early in the second half.

9 February 2011, Somma scored his first international goal against Kenya in only his second cap for South Africa. 21 March Somma was called up to the South Africa squad to face Egypt, however he was an unused substitute. In May 2011, South Africa legend Lucas Radebe said he believed that Somma could be the next Benni McCarthy for South Africa. 5 June Somma came on as a late substitute against Egypt to earn his 3rd cap in a 0–0 draw between the two countries.

== Honours ==
=== Club ===
Leeds United

- League One runners up (promoted): 2009–10

=== Individual ===
- Inducted into the NJCAA Men's Soccer Hall of Fame in 2011

== Career statistics ==
=== Club ===
Appearances and goals by club, season and competition
Club	Season	League			National Cup		League Cup		Other		Total	
Club	Season	Division	Apps	Goals	Apps	Goals	Apps	Goals	Apps	Goals	Apps	Goals
Pro Vasto	2005–06	Serie C2 Girone C	19	2	—		—		—		19	2
Pro Vasto	2006–07	Serie C2 Girone C	20	0	—		—		—		20	0
Pro Vasto	Total		39	2	0	0	0	0	0	0	39	2
Olbia	2007–08	Serie C2 Girone A	14	1	—		—		—		14	1
San Jose Earthquakes	2008	Major League Soccer	3	0	0	0	—		0	0	3	0
San Jose Earthquakes	2009	Major League Soccer	1	0	0	0	—		0	0	1	0
San Jose Earthquakes	Total		4	0	0	0	0	0	0	0	4	0
Leeds United	2009–10	League One	0	0	0	0	0	0	1 (Note: Appearance(s) in Football League Trophy)	0	1	0
Leeds United	2010–11	Championship	29	11	2	0	1	1	0	0	32	12
Leeds United	2011–12	Championship	0	0	0	0	0	0	0	0	0	0
Leeds United	2012–13	Championship	4	1	2	0	0	0	0	0	6	1
Leeds United	Total		33	12	4	0	1	1	1	0	39	13
Chesterfield (loan)	2009–10	League Two	3	0	0	0	0	0	0	0	3	0
Lincoln City (loan)	2009–10	League Two	14	9	0	0	0	0	0	0	14	9
Career total			107	24	4	0	1	1	1	0	113	25

=== International ===
Appearances and goals by national team and year
National team	Year	Apps	Goals
South Africa	2010	1	0
South Africa	2011	2	1
Total		3	1

Scores and results list South Africa's goal tally first, score column indicates score after each South Africa goal.

List of international goals scored by Davide Somma
No.	Date	Venue	Opponent	Score	Result	Competition	Ref.
1	9 February 2011	Royal Bafokeng Stadium, Rustenburg, South Africa	Kenya	1–0	2–0	Friendly	
