= Gwyn Williams (football manager) =

Welsh footballer

Gwyn Williams is a former Chelsea coach, assistant manager and chief scout who spent 27 years with the London club, before a seven year spell with Leeds United as technical director.

== Chelsea ==
Gwyn Williams joined Chelsea in 1979 and spent 27 years at Stamford Bridge where he served in a number of roles, including chief scout and as assistant manager under Claudio Ranieri, before eventually leaving the club in June 2006. He credits himself with discovering John Terry and helping Chelsea make a £14 million profit on Tore André Flo.

== Leeds United ==
Williams took up the post of technical director aimed mainly at scouting for Leeds United in 2006, following new chairman Ken Bates from Chelsea. He briefly took charge of the first team in January 2008 as they faced Southend United following the resignation of Dennis Wise. Two of his most high-profile findings at Leeds United were Robert Snodgrass in Scotland and Luciano Becchio in the Spanish second division.

== Sexual harassment, homophobia and racism allegations ==
In July 2013, Williams was dismissed by Leeds for gross misconduct after emailing pornographic images of women to a number of colleagues, including a female receptionist.

Williams has been accused of making homophobic comments to former Chelsea defender Graeme Le Saux. "He would wander up to me before training and say: 'Come on, poof, get your boots on'", Le Saux wrote in his 2007 autobiography.

In 2018, Williams, along with Chelsea manager Graham Rix, was accused of racism and physical assault by multiple trainees who were of school-age at the time. Both denied the allegations. After a seven-month investigation, the police decided there was insufficient evidence to take any action. However, after four former youth players sued Chelsea FC, the club agreed on 7 February 2022 to settle out of court with a total of eight former youth players paid damages up to six figure amounts.
