= Jimmy Dunn (footballer, born 1922) =

Scottish footballer (1922–2005

Personal information
- Full name: James Dunn
- Date of birth: 23 October 1922
- Place of birth: Rutherglen, Scotland
- Date of death: 7 February 2005 (aged 82)
- Place of death: Leeds, England
- Height: 5 ft 8 in (1.73 m)
- Position: Right back

Senior career*
Years	Team	Apps	(Gls)
- Royal Marines
1946–1947	Rutherglen Glencairn		
1947–1959	Leeds United	421	(1)
1959–1960	Darlington	27	(0)
1960	Scarborough		
Total		448	(1)
- * Club domestic league appearances and goals

James Dunn (23 October 1922 – 7 February 2005) was a Scottish professional footballer who played as a right full back for Leeds United, Darlington and Scarborough.

== Playing career ==
Born in Rutherglen, Lanarkshire, Scotland, Dunn served in the Royal Marines during World War II. He was spotted by a Leeds United scout while playing for his local junior team, Rutherglen Glencairn, and joined the West Riding of Yorkshire club in June 1947, aged 24. He made his debut in November 1947, and in the following season made the right back position his own, staying in the team for the next ten seasons.

The swift, hard-tackling Dunn was a key player for both manager Frank Buckley and his successor, Raich Carter; the defensive line of Dunn, Grenville Hair, Eric Kerfoot and Jack Charlton was a key component in Leeds' promotion to Division One in 1955–56. The Leeds team of the time was built around John Charles, who rated Dunn highly, describing him as "one of the best full-backs I ever played with... at tackling and covering he was unbelievable. Very fit, strong and hard." Dunn was widely considered one of the finest players in his position never to have played for his country.

When Carter was replaced as manager by Bill Lambton in 1959, his methods were so unpopular that he caused a players' rebellion in which Kerfoot and Dunn were to the fore. Both players left Leeds, with Dunn going to Darlington and then Scarborough. In the twilight of his career he suffered a knee injury which eventually forced his retirement.

Between 1947 and 1959 he made 443 appearances for Leeds, and scored one goal. In a poll of the 100 greatest ever Leeds United players, Dunn was voted in at number 73.

== Later life ==
After retiring from football, Dunn worked as a milkman, and then later at the Post Office, where he was driver's mate and a sorter until his retirement. He settled in Leeds and raised his family in the city, where he died in 2005, aged 82.
