= Luciano Becchio =

Argentine footballer (born 1983)

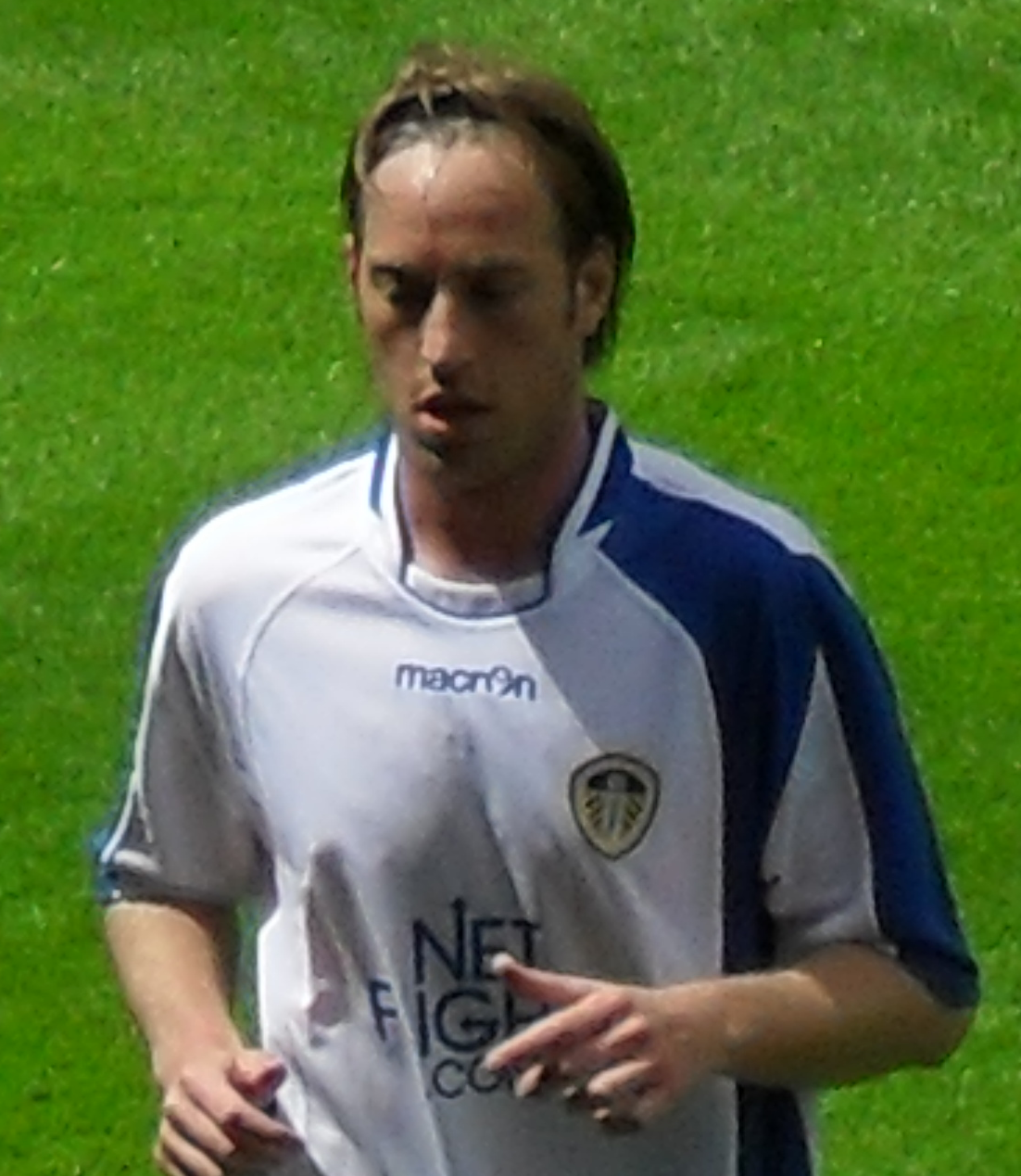
- Becchio playing for Leeds United in 2009

Personal information
- Full name: Luciano Héctor Becchio
- Date of birth: 28 December 1983 (age 42)
- Place of birth: Córdoba, Argentina
- Height: 1.87 m (6 ft 2 in)
- Position: Striker

Team information
- Current team: Atlético Baleares (assistant)

Youth career
- 2002–2003: Boca Juniors

Senior career*
Years	Team	Apps	(Gls)
2003–2005	Mallorca B	29	(5)
2004–2005	→ Ciudad de Murcia (loan)	16	(3)
2005–2006	Terrassa	24	(2)
2006–2007	Barcelona B	10	(0)
2007–2008	Mérida	50	(28)
2008–2013	Leeds United	190	(76)
2013–2015	Norwich City	13	(0)
2014–2015	→ Rotherham United (loan)	5	(2)
2015	Club Atlético Belgrano	3	(0)
2016	Rotherham United	2	(0)
2017	Atlético Baleares	18	(5)
2017	Binissalem	1	(1)
Total		361	(121)

Managerial career
- 2018–: Atlético Baleares (assistant)
- * Club domestic league appearances and goals

Luciano Héctor Becchio (born 28 December 1983) is an Argentine former professional footballer who played as a striker. He is the assistant manager of Segunda División B – Group 3 side Atlético Baleares.

Becchio began his career in Buenos Aires at Boca Juniors but moved to Europe aged 20 after failing to make the grade at Los Xeneizes. Through his ancestry, Becchio was able to claim an Italian passport and subsequent citizenship of the European Union, allowing him to sign for Spanish club Mallorca B in 2003. He would go on to play for a variety of other lower league clubs in the country over the next five years, including the Barcelona B team.

After a season at Mérida in the 2007–08 season, Becchio was recommended to Leeds United director of football Gwyn Williams by former Newcastle United midfielder Marcelino. He joined the Yorkshire club on trial during a pre-season tour of Ireland in July 2008. He signed shortly after the club's return to England, having impressed manager Gary McAllister.

Becchio went on to feature in over 200 games and scored over 80 goals at Leeds, achieving promotion from League One in 2010 and playing in the same team that knocked reigning English Champions Manchester United out of the FA Cup in January of the same year. Becchio became a firm fan favourite at Elland Road. Becchio signed for Premier League club Norwich City as part of a swap deal for Welsh striker Steve Morison on 31 January 2013. He was then released in May 2015 following Norwich City's promotion back to the Premier League via the playoffs.

== Career ==
=== Early life in Argentina ===
Becchio was born in Argentina's second-city of Córdoba located at the foothills of the Punilla Valley in the geographical centre of the country. As a child, he had a keen interest in tennis but football was his main passion; idolising legendary striker Gabriel Batistuta and following Buenos Aires-based Boca Juniors. In 2000, at the age of 16, he made the 425 mile-move south to join the youth ranks at Los Xeneizes where he was joined in his age group by the younger Carlos Tevez who went go on to achieve great success in European club football by winning Premier League titles with Manchester United and Manchester City.

=== Moving to Spain ===
Real Mallorca offered Becchio the chance to move to the La Liga side in 2003. With opportunities at Boca limited, he agreed to make the move to the Balearic Islands where he was joined by his parents and younger brother Mathias after selling their family restaurant business in Argentina to support their son in Europe. Mallorca coach Héctor Cúper placed Becchio in the 'B' team where he scored five times in 29 appearances. In his second season at the club, he signed for Ciudad Murcia on a loan deal.

After two years at Mallorca, Becchio moved to the Iberian Peninsula when he signed for Catalan club Terrassa where he spent the 2005–06 season before moving fifteen miles across the region to sign for reigning UEFA Champions League winners Barcelona. Becchio admitted that he would never have a chance of featuring for the first team but relished the opportunity to train with world class footballers such as Ronaldinho and Lionel Messi, whilst in the 'B' team he competed with notable young prodigies including Bojan Krkić and Giovani dos Santos for a starting position. A year later, he moved again; heading south-west to join Segunda División B team Mérida.

During the 2007–08 campaign, Becchio finally found regular football with Los Romanos and repaid the faith shown in him by topping the division top scorer charts with twenty-two goals for the season, including a final day hat-trick versus Baza. Mérida finished fourth and qualified for the division play-offs versus Ponferradina but lost on aggregate over two legs. Becchio's performances during the campaign didn't go unnoticed however, as he became the most saleable asset for the debt-stricken club after being monitored by scouts from across Europe.

=== Leeds United ===
==== 2008–09 season ====
In July 2008, Becchio joined League One side Leeds United on trial aiming to impress manager Gary McAllister in pre-season friendlies against Shelbourne and Barnet. He was recommended to Leeds scout Gwyn Williams by former Newcastle defender Marcelino. On 31 July, he signed for Leeds on a three-year contract.

Becchio made his first start for Leeds in their 5–2 win over Chester City in the first round of the League Cup. He was given his first league start against Yeovil Town in a 1–1 draw; in which it took him just 25 seconds to score his first Leeds goal. He scored his second goal for the club in his first start at Elland Road in a 4–0 victory over Crystal Palace in the League Cup. The following week, he came off the bench to head home his third Leeds goal in the 2–1 win over local rivals Bradford City in the Football League Trophy.

During the 2008–09 season, Becchio only missed one match in all competitions, which was due to suspension. In a sequence of appearances which saw him start 24 consecutive matches – including the entire busy Christmas period and while deputising for the injured Jermaine Beckford – he scored nine goals. With the loan signing of Lee Trundle from Bristol City, and the January transfer window signing of Mike Grella, manager Simon Grayson publicly stated that Becchio would be given a short resting period so that he would be ready for the vital last few months of the season. although that never materialised. In the final game of the season he scored his 18th goal of the season in all competitions, which in turn contributed to the relegation of Northampton Town. His 19th of the season came against Millwall in the League One play-off semi-final, in which he rounded off a fine team move started by Ben Parker, with Beckford and Andy Robinson also playing vital roles. He scored 19 goals in his début season in English football at Leeds.

==== 2009–10 season ====
Becchio scored his first goal of the 2009–10 season in the 1–0 league win against Wycombe Wanderers. He had a goal incorrectly ruled out for offside in the League Cup tie against Liverpool. He missed the game against Milton Keynes Dons as his wife was due to give birth. Becchio picked up a serious ankle injury in the game against Charlton Athletic on 9 September, when he stepped on the ball whilst controlling it from a high pass, and had to be substituted. He underwent scans on his ankle to diagnose possible ligament damage. In November Becchio was still sidelined; in his absence Leeds signed Welsh International striker Sam Vokes on loan from Wolverhampton Wanderers until 1 January 2010.

On 25 November 2009, Becchio returned from injury and played in Leeds' reserve team game against Lincoln City, to help boost his match fitness. He scored a goal in a 2–1 victory and also managed to play the full 90 minutes. He returned for the first team as a substitute in the FA Cup second round draw with Kettering Town. Two days later, he came on as a substitute against Oldham Athletic and scored his first goal since his long layoff, this his third of the season. He returned to Leeds' starting lineup in the league at the expense of Sam Vokes against Brentford. His fifth goal of the season was a header against Hartlepool United on boxing day, which took a heavy deflection.

Becchio played against Premier League team Manchester United when Leeds won 1–0 away at Old Trafford on 3 January 2010 in the FA Cup third round, but he picked up an injury and was substituted in stoppage time. Becchio struggled for goals for Leeds since returning from injury, with him being asked to play in more of a deeper strikers role to hold the ball up for the midfield. Against Tottenham Hotspur Becchio was dropped to the bench and replaced up front by Robert Snodgrass, although he later came on in the second half after replacing midfielder Michael Doyle as Leeds earned a replay against the Premier League side. Becchio's sixth goal of the season for Leeds came in the FA Cup replay against Tottenham, after Beckford's shot was parried by Heurelho Gomes and it fell into the path of Becchio who slotted it into the back of the net. Goals number seven and eight for Becchio came in the following game against Hartlepool. This was the first double he scored in a competitive match for Leeds.

Becchio scored another two goals against Oldham, taking his tally to ten goals for the season. He continued his fine goal scoring form when he scored his eleventh goal of the season in the Yorkshire derby against Huddersfield Town, with the game finishing 2–2. Goal number 12 of the season came against Tranmere Rovers, with Becchio scoring with a diving header.

Becchio was substituted early on in the first half against Norwich City after being knocked unconscious after a clash of heads with Michael Nelson. His head also landed heavily on the ground which caused him to swallow his tongue. He was substituted by Mike Grella and due to the injury was ruled out against Swindon Town.

Becchio returned from injury for Leeds when he was named on the bench against Southend United and managed to score his 13th goal of the season in the 83rd minute after he replaced Beckford as a substitute in Leeds' 2–0 win. Goals number 14 and 15 came when Becchio scored a brace against Carlisle United. Becchio scored his 16th of the season with a goal against Gillingham in Leeds 3–2 defeat. Becchio's 17th goal came against Milton Keynes Dons in Leeds' 4–1 win. Becchio played an instrumental part as Leeds were promoted to the Football League Championship after finishing in second place in League One and thus earning automatic promotion.

==== 2010–11 season ====
Becchio started the opening game and scored Leeds' first goal of the Championship season against Derby County and slotted in an equaliser after a run by Jonny Howson, however Leeds lost 2–1. Becchio's second goal of the season came in Leeds' second match of the season in the League Cup against Lincoln City. He scored his third goal of the season in the match against Swansea City. Despite being dropped for the game against Doncaster, he returned to the side in the yorkshire derby vs Sheffield United as Leeds ran out 1–0 winners. Becchio scored his fourth goal of the season against Preston North End. Becchio scored his fifth goal of the season with a fine left footed volley and received the man of the match award against Middlesbrough. In the post match on-the-pitch interview with Sky Sports he also famously swore live on air stating that it was a "fucking unbelievable win!"

His sixth goal of the season came in the following game in the 2–1 loss against Leicester City. In November 2010 Becchio entered contract negotiations with Leeds over extending his contract. In the game against Hull City, he suffered a black eye after being elbowed by Ian Ashbee Becchio scored his seventh, eighth and ninth goals of the season with a 17-minute hat-trick against Bristol City after coming on as a second-half substitute

On 3 December 2010, Becchio won The Championship PFA Player of the Month Award for November, beating competition from Adel Taarabt, Lewis McGugan, Scott Sinclair and Jay Bothroyd for the award. He scored his tenth and eleventh goals of the season when he scored a brace against Crystal Palace from 1–0 down. Leeds confirmed that contract talks with Becchio were ongoing and had only been delayed due to translation issues. Becchio scored his 12th goal of the season against Burnley.

On 18 December 2010, after the 2–0 home win against Queens Park Rangers which took Leeds to second place in the Championship, Becchio signed a new three-and-a-half-year contract with Leeds. 1 January 2011, Becchio scored his 13th goal of the season with an injury time equaliser against Middlesbrough.

On 8 January, Becchio helped earn Leeds a 1–1 draw against Arsenal in the third round of the FA Cup. Leeds went 1–0 up when Robert Snodgrass scored a second half penalty, Arsenal equalised in the 90th minute when Cesc Fàbregas scored a penalty. However, on 18 January, Becchio was injured and missed the second leg which Arsenal went on to win 3–1. He returned to Leeds' starting lineup against Portsmouth and scored his 14th goal of the season, the goal also reached his 50th goal milestone for Leeds in all competitions. Becchio scored his 15th goal of the season against Norwich City. His 16th goal of the season came against Yorkshire rivals Barnsley, the game marked his 100th league start for Leeds. Becchio scored his 20th goal of the season against Watford in a 2–2 draw, he, however, picked up an injury in the same game which caused him to miss all the remaining games left in the season. After doing rehab on his hamstring injury in Spain, Becchio returned to light training for Leeds in time for the start of pre-season training.

==== 2011–12 season ====
Becchio injured his hamstring again before a pre-season tour of Scotland. On 22 July, he had surgery on his hamstring injury. The injury ruled Becchio out for a few months and meant he would miss the start of the 2011–12 season. After five months out injured, Becchio returned to Leeds' first team when he was named on the bench against Crystal Palace on 10 September. He came on as a second-half substitute and scored his first goal of the season with a header in Leeds' 3–2 victory, the goal also marked Becchio's 50th 'league goal' milestone for the club. Becchio came on as a substitute against Bristol City on 1h September providing the assist for Ross McCormack's winning goal.

Becchio made his first start of the season on 20 September, coming into the side against rivals Manchester United, after previously being used as a substitute due to the form of Andy Keogh and Ross McCormack. On 22 October 2011, Becchio thought he had scored a dramatic late winner against Peterborough United in a 3–2 win, however teammate Darren O'Dea was credited with the goal. After getting a rare start Becchio scored his second goal of the season on 29 November in Leeds' emphatic 4–0 win against Nottingham Forest.

During December, Becchio was linked with a move to fellow Championship side Middlesbrough. However, Leeds Chairman Ken Bates revealed he would not sell Becchio to one of the clubs closest rivals in the same league. Becchio's third goal of the season came as a consolation in Leeds' 4–1 loss against Barnsley on 31 December 2011.

Becchio finished the 2011–12 season with his lowest goal tally for Leeds with just 11 league goals, however this was largely down to a hamstring injury suffered towards the end of the 2010–11 of the season, causing him to miss the following pre-season training and the first part of the subsequent season. On 4 May, Neil Warnock stated his belief that Becchio would come back a stronger player for the 2012–13 season and recapture his prior form with a full pre-season behind him.

==== 2012–13 season ====
Becchio scored his first goal of the season in the first game of the season against Shrewsbury Town in the League Cup on 11 August. He scored his second goal of the season and his first in the league by scoring the winner in Leeds opening day victory against Wolverhampton Wanderers. He scored his seventh goal of the season on 22 September against Nottingham Forest. He scored his 10th goal of the season on 30 October in Leeds' 3–0 League Cup win against Premier League side Southampton to help Leeds advance to the Quarter Finals of the competition.

Becchio scored a brace against local rivals Huddersfield Town to help earn Leeds a 4–2 victory on 1 December. The goals were his 13th and 14th of the season. Becchio scored his 15th goal of the season against Premier League side Chelsea in the League Cup tie on 19 December 2012. On 22 December, Becchio scored his 16th and 17th goal against Middlesbrough helping Leeds win 2–1.

On 1 January, Becchio scored his 76th Leeds United league goal, which made him Leeds' 10th All-Time Goalscorer in the league, overtaking Arthur Hydes.

On 24 January 2013, Leeds announced that Becchio had handed in a transfer request after talks of a new deal broke down. A Leeds statement said Becchio was already the club's highest earner and his wage demands "were beyond a level we could support". On 30 January 2013, Becchio was revealed to be in talks to join Norwich City as part of a swap deal for Norwich's Welsh international striker Steve Morison who was in talks to move to Leeds United. Norwich manager Chris Hughton confirmed that he was hoping to complete a deal to sign Becchio as part of a swap deal for Steve Morison. Becchio scored 19 goals for Leeds in the 2012–13 season for Leeds before departing the club.

In total, Becchio scored 87 goals in 221 appearances for Leeds in all competitions.

=== Norwich City ===
On transfer deadline day 31 January 2013, Norwich confirmed the signing of Becchio on their website on a three-and-a-half-year deal in a swap for striker Steve Morison, making their second incoming transfer of the January window. He was handed shirt number 19. He made his début away at Queens Park Rangers on 2 February 2013, coming on in the 87th minute as a substitute. He would subsequently make his first start the following match at home against Fulham on 9 February, playing the majority of the match but not scoring.

He was released on 28 May 2015 following Norwich City's promotion back to the Premier League via the playoffs.

==== Rotherham United loan ====
On 1 September 2014, Becchio signed for Rotherham United on loan until 1 January 2015.

=== Belgrano ===
After being released by Norwich City at the end of the 2014–15 season when his contract expired, Becchio returned to his homeland Argentina to play for Belgrano in the Argentine Primera División. He signed a one-year deal. The contract was cancelled in September 2015 due to injuries.

=== Becchio returns to Rotherham ===
On 21 January 2016, it was confirmed that Becchio had re-signed for English Championship side Rotherham United on a contract until the end of the season, to work under former Leeds manager Neil Redfearn.

==== Trial spells ====
After leaving Rotherham, Becchio had trial spells at Bristol City and Coventry City.

=== Atlético Baleares ===
On 12 January 2017, Becchio revealed on his official Twitter page that he had signed for Spanish side Atlético Baleares managed by Christian Ziege. On 24 January 2017, Becchio scored on his debut in a 1–0 victory over Cornellà. He helped the club reach the Segunda División B – Group 3 playoffs scoring five goals in 18 games.

=== Binissalem ===
Becchio joined Binissalem and scored on his debut.

== Coaching career ==
On 17 January 2018, Becchio returned to Atlético Baleares as an assistant manager to Horacio Melgarejo.

== Personal life ==
Luciano is married to Patricia Bosquet with whom he has three children. Their first born child, daughter Bianca, was born at Leeds General Infirmary in September 2009.

Becchio's boyhood hero was former Boca Juniors, Fiorentina and Roma striker Gabriel Batistuta.

== Career statistics ==
Appearances and goals by club, season and competition
Club	Season	League			National Cup (Note: Includes Copa del Rey and FA Cup)		League Cup		Other		Total	
Club	Season	Division	Apps	Goals	Apps	Goals	Apps	Goals	Apps	Goals	Apps	Goals
Mallorca B	2000–01	Segunda División B	17	5	—		—		—		17	5
Mallorca B	2004–05	Segunda División B	13	0	—		—		—		13	0
Mallorca B	Total		30	5	—		—		—		30	5
Mallorca	2004–05	La Liga	0	0	1	0	—		—		1	0
Ciudad Murcia (loan)	2004–05	Segunda División	16	3	0	0	—		—		16	3
Terrassa	2005–06	Segunda División B	24	2	1	0	—		—		25	2
Barcelona B	2006–07	Segunda División B	10	0	—		—		—		10	0
Mérida	2006–07	Segunda División B	12	5	—		—		—		12	5
Mérida	2007–08	Segunda División B	38	22	—		—		2 (Note: Appearances in Segunda División B play-offs)	0	40	22
Mérida	Total		52	27	—		—		2	0	54	27
Leeds United	2008–09	League One	45	16	3	0	4	2	4 (Note: Two appearances in Football League Trophy, two appearances and one goal in Football League One play-offs)	1	56	19
Leeds United	2009–10	League One	37	15	5	2	3	0	2 (Note: Appearances in Football League Trophy)	0	47	17
Leeds United	2010–11	Championship	41	19	1	0	2	1	—		44	20
Leeds United	2011–12	Championship	41	11	1	0	1	0	—		43	11
Leeds United	2012–13	Championship	26	15	1	1	4	3	—		31	19
Leeds United	Total		190	76	11	3	14	6	6	1	221	86
Norwich City	2012–13	Premier League	8	0	—		—		—		8	0
Norwich City	2013–14	Premier League	5	0	1	0	1	0	—		7	0
Norwich City	2014–15	Championship	0	0	0	0	1	0	0	0	1	0
Norwich City	Total		13	0	1	0	2	0	0	0	16	0
Rotherham United (loan)	2014–15	Championship	5	2	—		—		—		5	2
Belgrano	2015	Primera División	3	0	—		—		0	0	3	0
Rotherham United	2015–16	Championship	2	0	—		—		—		2	0
Atlético Baleares	2016–17	Segunda División B	14	4	—		—		4	1	38	0
Career total			364	114	15	1	4	1	12	0	495	124

== Honours ==
Leeds United

- League One runner-up: 2009–10

Individual

- PFA Championship Player of the Month: November 2010
- Segunda División B: Pichichi golden boot: 2007–08 (22 goals)
