= Ryan Jones (footballer, born 1992) =

English footballer

Personal information
- Date of birth: 2 April 1992 (age 34)
- Place of birth: Liverpool, England
- Position: Goalkeeper

Youth career
- 2008–2009: Leeds United

Senior career*
Years	Team	Apps	(Gls)
2009–2010	Rochdale	0	(0)
2010	→ AFC Telford United (loan)	0	(0)
2010–2011	Northwich Victoria	3	(0)
2011–2013	Richmond Kickers	5	(0)
2012	→ Bacup Borough (loan)	5	(0)
2012	Bootle		
2013–2014	Stockport County	1	(0)
2014–2015	A.F.C. Liverpool	40	(0)
2016	Bootle		
2016	→ Bradford Park Avenue (dual reg)	7	(0)
2016	Bradford Park Avenue	4	(0)
2016–2017	Bootle		
2017	Radcliffe Borough		
2018–2021	Bootle		
2021–2023	Litherland		
2023–2024	Garswood United		
2024–2025	Bala Town	0	(0)
- * Club domestic league appearances and goals as of 08:10, 3 September 2017 (UTC)

Ryan Jones (born 2 April 1992) is an English footballer who plays a goalkeeper.

== Career ==
After several stints with Rochdale, Telford United and Northwich Victoria, Jones signed with USL Pro club Richmond Kickers, making him the youngest player in club history. On 14 August 2011, Jones made his debut for Richmond in a 0–0 draw on the road against Los Angeles Blues.

On 12 January 2012, he signed for North West Counties Premier Division side Bacup Borough on loan. He made his debut for the club nine days later in a 1–0 loss to Stone Dominoes. He later played for Bootle in the same season.

He was released by Richmond in August 2013 to allow him to return to England.

On 28 August 2013, he signed for Stockport County on non-contract terms replacing Lewis King who left the club two days prior. He saved a penalty in his debut for Stockport in their 4–2 home win against Telford United.

In January 2014, AFC Liverpool signed Jones. During his time with the club he was awarded the "Player of the month" award in August 2014.

In March 2016 he rejoined Bootle before signing dual registration forms with Bradford Park Avenue and playing seven games for them at the end of the season.

In July after playing pre-season games, he signed a permanent transfer to Bradford Park Avenue before in September 2016 he rejoined Bootle.

At the beginning of the 2017 season he appeared for Radcliffe Borough.

In August 2024 he signed for Cymru Premier side Bala Town.
