= Bert Duffield =

English footballer

Personal information
- Full name: Albert Duffield
- Date of birth: 3 March 1894
- Place of birth: Owston Ferry, England
- Date of death: 27 September 1981 (aged 87)
- Place of death: Beeston, England
- Height: 5 ft 7 1/2 in (1.71 m)
- Position: Full-back

Senior career*
Years	Team	Apps	(Gls)
1912–1914	Gainsborough Trinity		
–1920	Castleford Town		
1920–1925	Leeds United	203	(0)
Total		203	(0)
- * Club domestic league appearances and goals

Albert Duffield (3 March 1894 – 27 September 1981), commonly known as Bert Duffield, was an English footballer who played as a full-back.

== Early life ==
Duffield was born in Owston Ferry in Lincolnshire on 3 March 1894.

== Career ==
Between 1912 and 1914, Duffield played for Gainsborough Trinity before serving as a bombardier in France during World War One. Following the end of the war, Duffield played for Midland League side Castleford Town before joining newly formed Leeds United in the summer of 1920. His debut for the club came on 28 August 1920 in Leeds United's first ever league match against Port Vale. Duffield made 203 league appearances in the First and Second Divisions for Leeds United before leaving to join Bradford (Park Avenue) in 1925. As of 2024, over 100 years after leaving Leeds United, Duffield still holds the club record for most appearances by an outfield player without scoring a goal. He retired for Bradford (Park Avenue) in June 1929 after 51 appearances.

== Personal life ==
Following his retirement, he worked as a greengrocer before running a poultry farm in Rawcliffe. He died in Beeston in Leeds on 27 September 1981.
