= Tom Holley =

English footballer

Tom Holley (15 November 1913 – September 1992) was a professional footballer who played for Sunderland, Barnsley and Leeds United.

Born in Wolverhampton, he began his career with Sunderland at the turn of the 1930s, joining Barnsley later in the decade and guesting for Huddersfield Town during World War II. He signed for Leeds United for £3,750 in July 1936 and became team captain, playing in the centre half position. He guested for Huddersfield Town during World War II but returned to Leeds after the war had ended and remained there until retiring at the end of the 1948-49 season. He had played a total of 169 games for Leeds, scoring once.

After retiring from playing, he found himself a career in journalism as a football writer for the Yorkshire Evening Post and then The Sunday People, before retiring and moving to Mallorca. He returned to England and Yorkshire in 1989, dying there in September 1992 at the age of 78.
