= Eric Kerfoot =

English footballer

Personal information
- Date of birth: 31 July 1924
- Place of birth: Ashton-under-Lyne, England
- Date of death: 4 March 1980 (aged 55)
- Place of death: Dukinfield, England
- Position: Wing half

Senior career*
Years	Team	Apps	(Gls)
–1949	Stalybridge Celtic		
1949–1959	Leeds United	336	(9)
1959–1960	Chesterfield	9	(0)
- * Club domestic league appearances and goals

Eric Kerfoot (31 July 1924 – 4 March 1980) was an English footballer. He was a long-serving wing-half for Leeds United and Chesterfield in the 1950s.

Kerfoot joined Leeds United from Stalybridge Celtic in 1949. An excellent and enterprising wing-half, he was one of the most consistent Leeds players, being ever-present in four seasons including the 1955–56 side that won promotion to Division 1 in 1956. He also captained Leeds in 1954–55. In total, Kerfoot made 349 appearances for Leeds, and scored 10 goals.

== Career ==
Kerfoot was signed from non-league Stalybridge Celtic in December 1949, for a fee of £3,000. Though he initially signed for the reserve side, an injury to Jimmy McCabe meant he made his first-team debut less than two weeks after signing for the club, away to Queen's Park Rangers.

Kerfoot eventually left for Chesterfield in 1959, and was released by the club after a season there.
