= Bill Menzies =

Scottish footballer

Personal information
- Full name: William John Menzies
- Date of birth: 10 July 1901
- Place of birth: Bucksburn, Scotland
- Date of death: 1970 (aged 68–69)
- Position: Full-back

Senior career*
Years	Team	Apps	(Gls)
1921–1923	Mugiemoss Juniors		
1923–1932	Leeds United	248	(1)
1933	Goole Town		
Total		248	(1)
- * Club domestic league appearances and goals

William John Menzies (10 July 1901 – 1970) was a Scottish footballer who played in the Football League for Leeds United.
