= Jimmy McCabe =

Northern Irish footballer (1918–1989)

Personal information
- Full name: James Joseph McCabe
- Date of birth: 17 September 1918
- Place of birth: Draperstown, Ireland
- Date of death: July 1989 (aged 70)
- Place of death: Cleveland, England
- Height: 5 ft 9 1/2 in (1.77 m)
- Position: Wing half

Youth career
- Billingham Synthonia
- South Bank St Peters

Senior career*
Years	Team	Apps	(Gls)
1937–1948	Middlesbrough	34	(0)
1948–1954	Leeds United	152	(0)
1954–1955	Peterborough United	31	(1)
Total		217	(1)

International career
1948–1953	Northern Ireland	6	(0)
- * Club domestic league appearances and goals

James Joseph McCabe (17 September 1918 – July 1989) was a Northern Irish footballer who played as a wing half.

== Career ==
Born in Draperstown, McCabe played for Billingham Synthonia, South Bank St Peters, Middlesbrough, Leeds United and Peterborough United. He also earned six caps for the Northern Ireland national team.
