= Robert Snodgrass =

Scottish footballer (born 1987)

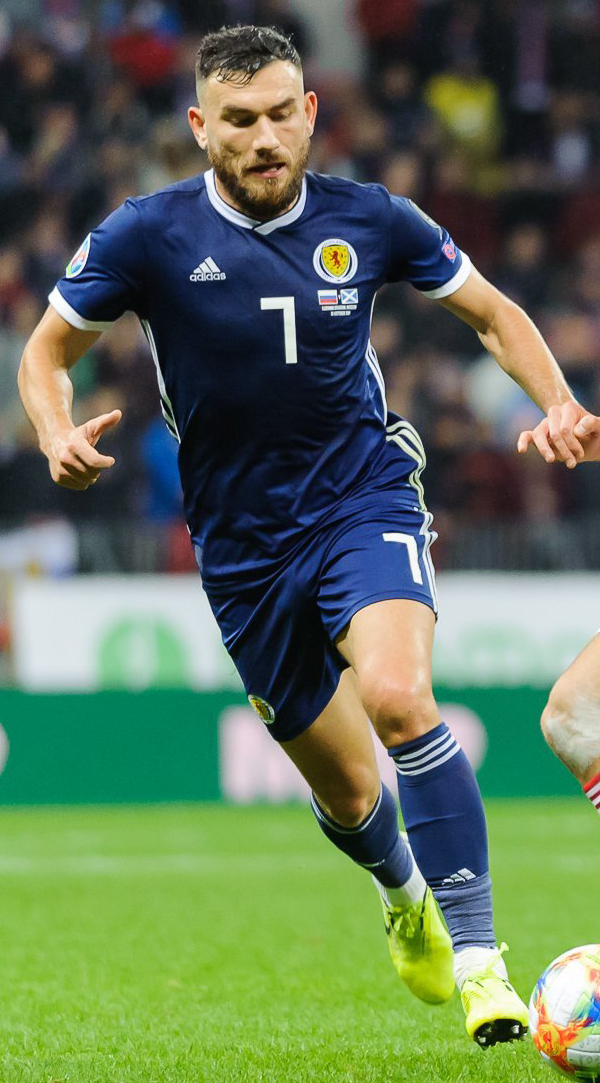
- Snodgrass playing for Scotland in 2019

Personal information
- Full name: Robert Snodgrass
- Date of birth: 7 September 1987 (age 39)
- Place of birth: Glasgow, Scotland
- Height: 6 ft 0 in (1.83 m)
- Positions: Midfielder; winger

Youth career
- Rangers South BC
- 2000–2004: Livingston

Senior career*
Years	Team	Apps	(Gls)
2004–2008	Livingston	79	(15)
2007	→ Stirling Albion (loan)	12	(5)
2008–2012	Leeds United	168	(35)
2012–2014	Norwich City	67	(12)
2014–2017	Hull City	45	(11)
2017–2021	West Ham United	75	(7)
2017–2018	→ Aston Villa (loan)	40	(7)
2021–2022	West Bromwich Albion	14	(0)
2022	Luton Town	8	(0)
2022–2023	Heart of Midlothian	23	(1)
Total		531	(93)

International career
2007	Scotland U20	3	(0)
2008	Scotland U21	2	(0)
2011–2019	Scotland	28	(7)
- * Club domestic league appearances and goals

Robert Snodgrass (born 7 September 1987) is a Scottish former professional footballer who played as a winger.

Snodgrass started his senior career with Livingston. He also had a loan spell at Stirling Albion before moving to England in 2008, joining Leeds United. He helped Leeds win promotion to the Championship in 2010. In February 2012, Snodgrass was appointed captain of Leeds, but he rejected a new contract offer and moved to Norwich City later that year.

He left Norwich after they were relegated in 2014 and moved to Hull City. On his league debut for Hull, Snodgrass suffered a serious knee injury that sidelined him for over a year. Hull were relegated in his absence, but Snodgrass helped them gain promotion via the playoffs in 2016. Snodgrass moved to West Ham United in January 2017, and he was loaned to Aston Villa for most of the 2017–18 season. After Snodgrass left West Ham in January 2021, he had short stints with West Bromwich Albion, Luton Town and Heart of Midlothian at the end of his career.

After playing for Scotland at various youth levels including under-21s, Snodgrass received a call up to the Scotland national team side in 2009, and won his first cap in February 2011. Snodgrass retired from international football in October 2019, having made 28 appearances and scored seven goals for Scotland.

== Early life ==
Born in Glasgow, Snodgrass grew up in the city's Gallowgate area; he played boys' club football for a team affiliated with Rangers alongside future international teammate James McArthur who is a month younger and lived a few blocks away. Celtic offered him an apprenticeship, along with Clyde and Livingston. He felt that he had little chance of breaking through at Parkhead, so chose Livingston, joining their setup at the same time as another East End boy who would go on to play for Scotland, Graham Dorrans.

== Club career ==
=== Livingston ===
Snodgrass started his career at Livingston, where he scored 15 goals in 79 league games. He caught attention by turning down a trial with Spanish giants Barcelona. Before he turned professional, he was offered a move to Blackburn Rovers, though he chose to stay with Livingston. After recovering from a broken metatarsal, he moved to Stirling Albion on loan for the remainder of the 2006–07 season on 30 January 2007 to step up his recovery from injury.

Snodgrass established himself as a regular first-team member during the 2005–06 season. This was a campaign of mixed fortunes, as he gained regular first-team football, yet his side were relegated to Division 1. During Livingston's first season in the second tier, he scored ten goals for Livingston in the Scottish First Division during the 2007–08 season; he was offered a new contract at Livingston, but turned it down. After failing to impress during a trial spell with Barnsley, he joined League One team Leeds United in July 2008. He left the Lions scoring 15 goals in 79 games.

=== Leeds United ===
==== 2008–09 season ====
After joining Leeds, Snodgrass came into the side for the first game of the season to make his debut against Scunthorpe United, gaining an assist after setting up Enoch Showunmi's headed goal. He scored his first goal for Leeds in the 5–2 League Cup victory over Chester City. After initially struggling to hold a regular place in the starting line-up, Snodgrass established himself after a string of impressive performances throughout November and December, which saw the young winger score four goals in seven games during a poor run of form for the Yorkshire club, culminating in the sacking of manager Gary McAllister.

Leeds reached the playoffs but ultimately were knocked out of the competition after losing 2–1 on aggregate to Millwall. In his first season at Leeds, he scored 11 goals and got 19 assists.

==== 2009–10 season ====
On the eve of the season, Snodgrass signed a new four-year contract with the club. He scored his first goals of the season with two against Watford in the League Cup second round, sending Leeds through to the third round.

Snodgrass scored a late winner against Milton Keynes Dons in a 1–0 win for Leeds for his first league goal of the season.

In May 2010, he was selected in the League One PFA Team of the Year for the 2009–10 season. Snodgrass played an instrumental part as Leeds were promoted to The Championship after finishing in second place in League One and thus earning automatic promotion. In his second season Snodgrass scored 10 goals in total and gained 14 assists.

==== 2010–11 season ====
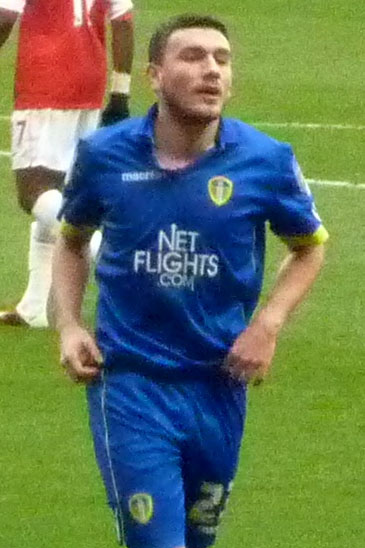
Snodgrass playing for Leeds United in 2011

On 27 July 2010, Snodgrass was believed to have suffered a serious knee injury during the pre-season game away to Norwegian team Brann after falling victim to a horrendous challenge by David Nielsen. The knee injury ruled him out of the rest of the pre-season campaign, but after two scans on the injured knee, the injury was not as serious as first feared, but kept Snodgrass out for several weeks. Manager Simon Grayson claimed that no exact timescale had been put on Snodgrass' recovery from injury. Snodgrass returned to training at the start of September 2010. To help gain match fitness after his injury, Snodgrass played 90 minutes in a closed-doors friendly against Middlesbrough. Snodgrass returned to Leeds' squad after injury when he was named on the bench the game against Doncaster Rovers, he came on as a second-half substitute replacing Ross McCormack.

Snodgrass came on as a second-half substitute against Sheffield United and managed to assist Leeds' late winner for Bradley Johnson, however his game ended on a sour note when he was sent off for two yellow cards. Snodgrass returned from suspension for Leeds against Ipswich Town, replacing Luciano Becchio in the starting line-up and scored his first goal of the season. He scored his second goal of the season with a curled effort against Coventry City. His performance against Coventry was welcomed as a return to form by Snodgrass. His third goal of the season came against Leicester City with a long-range effort.

On 1 January 2011, Snodgrass was injured in the 1–1 draw with Middlesbrough, where he was kicked once in the back as well as being stamped on the calf muscle. He scored against Cardiff City with another long range goal. On 8 January 2011, Snodgrass scored with a second half penalty in a 1–1 FA Cup draw with Arsenal. He scored his sixth goal of the season on 1 February, against Hull City. Snodgrass scored against Bristol City on 12 February. Snodgrass missed Leeds' last few games of the season after suffering a back injury.

==== 2011–12 season ====
In June 2011, it was reported that Leeds had put an £8 million valuation on Snodgrass and that they were looking into offering him a new contract. Snodgrass missed the League Cup match in August 2011 against Bradford City as he had been called up to the Scotland squad. He started for Leeds on the opening day of the season as they lost 3–1 against Southampton. He scored his first goal of the season on 16 August, when he scored a freekick against Hull City. Snodgrass was ruled out of action when he had an emergency operation to have his appendix removed on 31 December 2011. He returned to action for Leeds just two weeks later, scoring in a 1–1 draw against Crystal Palace on 14 January 2012. On 21 January, he scored a goal in a 3–1 win over Ipswich.

Snodgrass was appointed club captain by new Leeds manager Neil Warnock, ahead of his first game in charge against Portsmouth on 25 February. Warnock confirmed he had offered Snodgrass a new contract which would make him Leeds' highest-paid player. Snodgrass finished the season with 13 goals and the second highest amount of assists in The Championship, with 14. Snodgrass won both Leeds' Fans Player of the Year and Players' Player of the Year awards during the club's end of season awards ceremony on 28 April.

=== Norwich City ===
Snodgrass signed for Norwich City on a three-year contract in July 2012 for an undisclosed fee. He made his debut in the opening game of the season on 18 August 2012, a 5–0 defeat away to Fulham. Two matches later, on 1 September 2012, Snodgrass scored his first goal for the club when he scored the equaliser which saw Norwich draw 1–1 with Tottenham Hotspur. He scored his second goal on 28 November, scoring a free-kick in a 1–1 draw against Southampton.

Snodgrass would go on to establish himself as a regular in the first team squad. After a successful campaign in which the club finished 11th in the table, he would be voted by Norwich fans as second place in the Player of the Season that season. He narrowly missed out on the trophy, which was won by Sébastien Bassong instead.

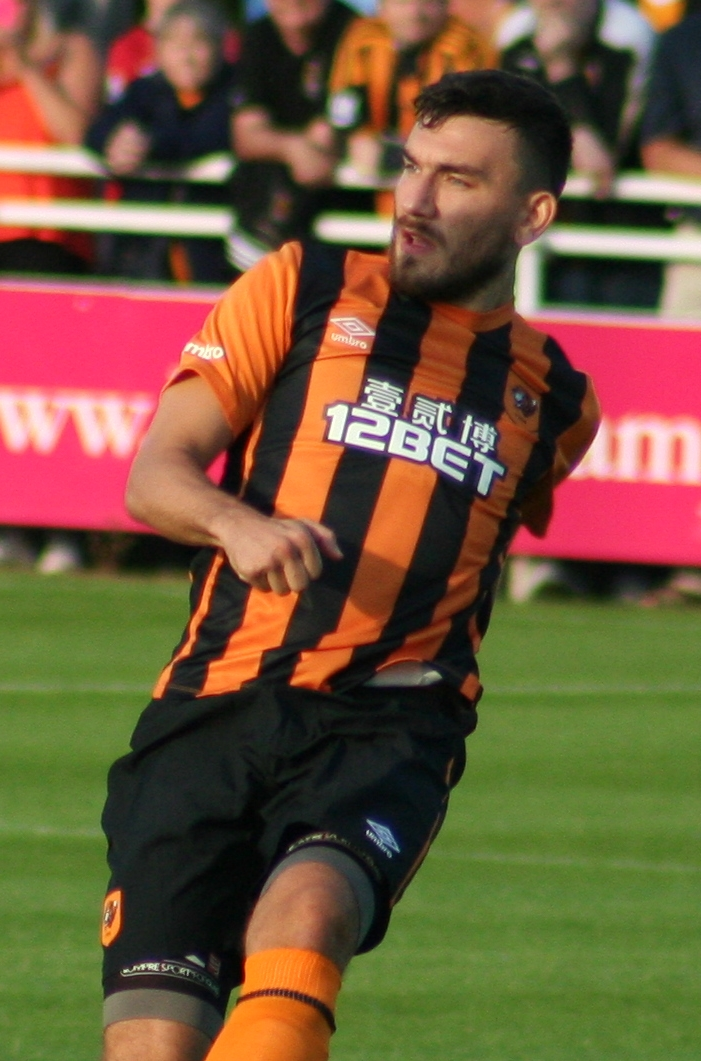
Snodgrass playing for Hull City in 2014

Snodgrass scored his first goal of the 2013–14 season with a "free-kick from around 20 yards that looped over the wall and into the bottom-left corner of the net" in a 3–1 win over West Ham United on 9 November. He scored again on 23 February 2014 against Tottenham after a cutting through ball from Bradley Johnson, holding off the defender and placing it past goalkeeper Hugo Lloris from just inside the box. That goal turned out to be the only goal, as Norwich won 1–0.

=== Hull City ===
On 30 June 2014, Hull City signed Snodgrass for an undisclosed fee, believed to exceed £6 million, on a three-year contract. Snodgrass dislocated a kneecap during a 1–0 win at Queens Park Rangers in August 2014. The injury, which required surgery to heal, was initially expected to keep Snodgrass out of action for several months. A month later, it was reported that he would be out of action for the entirety of the 2014–15 season. Snodgrass made his first appearance in a game since the injury in November 2015, playing in an under-21 Premier League Cup match. His first return to first-team action was in the League Cup away to Manchester City on 1 December 2015 when he came on as a replacement for Sone Aluko in the 73rd-minute. On 9 January 2016, in the third-round of the FA Cup match against Brighton & Hove Albion, he scored a penalty to take the team through the next round. On 10 December 2016 Snodgrass won a penalty in a crucial home tie against Crystal Palace. Replays showed that he dived and he later apologised.

In January 2017, Hull accepted offers of about £10 million for Snodgrass from West Ham and Burnley.

=== West Ham United ===
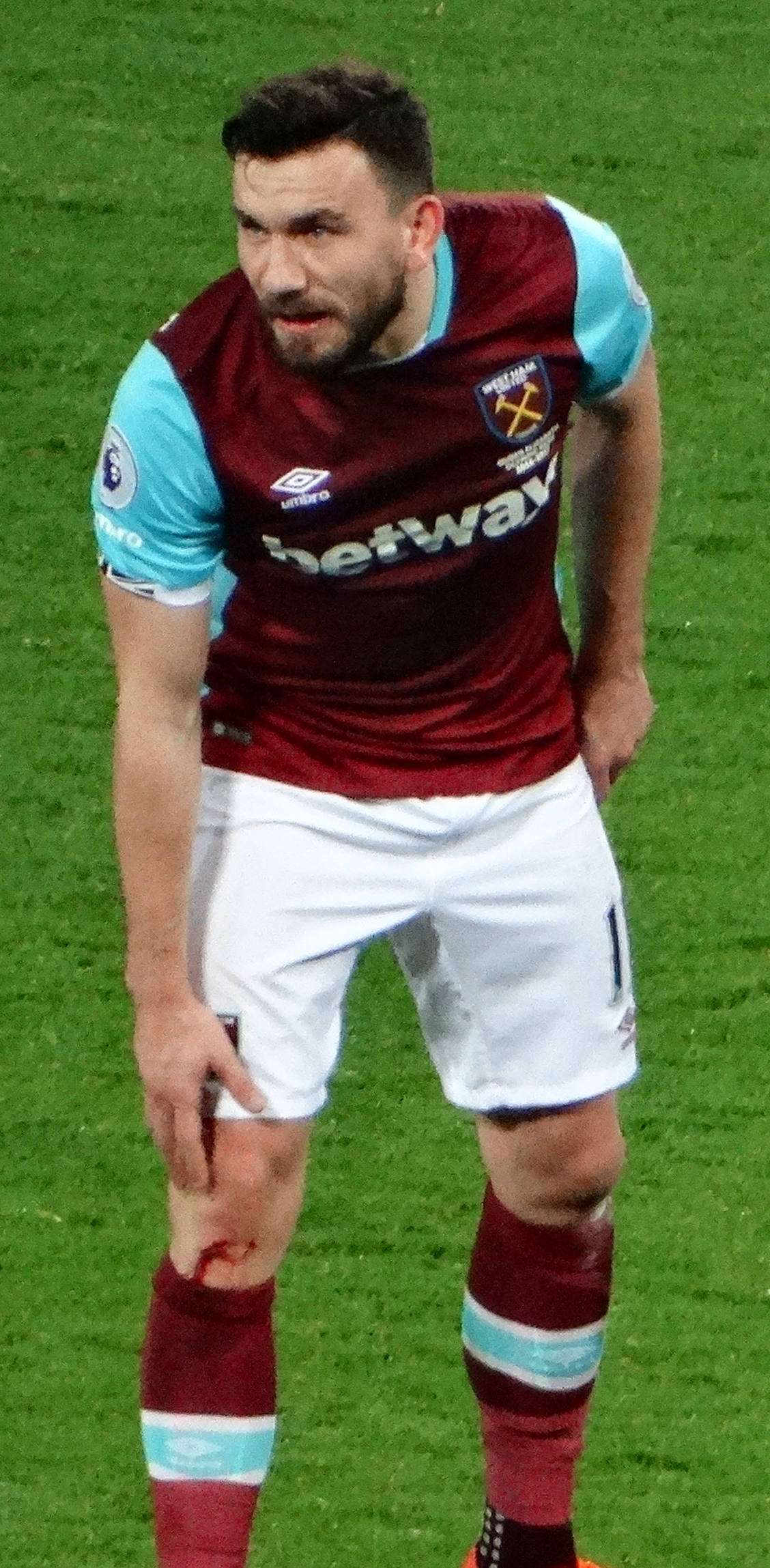
Snodgrass playing for West Ham United in 2017

On 27 January 2017, Snodgrass joined West Ham United on a three-and-a-half-year deal for a fee of £10.2 million. He made his West Ham debut on 1 February 2017, coming on as a 64th-minute substitute for Pedro Obiang, in West Ham's 0–4 home defeat by Manchester City. His first start for the club came away at Saint Mary's Stadium against Southampton, which West Ham won 1–3. In August 2017, having played 15 games for West Ham without scoring, Snodgrass was told that he was free to leave the club either permanently or on loan.

Snodgrass spent most of the 2017–18 season on loan at Aston Villa, after which he returned to West Ham. He scored his first two goals for West Ham in their 8–0 win against Macclesfield Town in the EFL Cup on 26 September 2018. In March 2019, Snodgrass was charged by the Football Association with allegedly abusing anti-doping officials who were visiting West Ham's training ground on 6 February 2019 to conduct out-of-competition testing. The following month, Snodgrass was fined £30,000 and given a one-match ban for the offence. In July 2019, Snodgrass signed a one-year extension to his contract which would keep him at the club until the summer of 2021, with a further 12-month option. However, Snodgrass left the club to join West Bromwich Albion on 8 January 2021.

==== Aston Villa loan ====
On 25 August 2017, Snodgrass joined Aston Villa for the remainder of the 2017–18 season. Snodgrass impressed with his early performances for Aston Villa winning praise from manager, Steve Bruce. He scored his first goal for the club in a 4–0 win over Burton Albion on 26 September.

During his loan spell he scored seven goals and got 14 assists, to help Aston Villa secure a play-off place and defeat Middlesbrough in the two semi finals to reach the final, playing in the final, as Villa lost 1–0 to Fulham in the final missing out on promotion to the Premier League. His 14 assists also saw him finish joint top (with Barry Douglas) of the assists charts in the EFL Championship.

=== West Bromwich Albion ===
On 8 January 2021, Snodgrass joined West Bromwich Albion on an 18-month contract for an undisclosed fee. He made his West Brom debut on 16 January in a 3–2 win in a Black Country derby at Molineux. He was omitted from the squad for their next game, a 2–1 defeat at West Ham on 19 January. West Brom manager Sam Allardyce said that he had not played due to "an agreement between the clubs". The Premier League stated their intention to investigate the terms of the transfer with regard to a possible violation of their rules regarding one club's influence over the policies or the performance of another club. Snodgrass had been transferred permanently by West Ham, and it is only loan deals that allow for that kind of restriction. On 31 January 2022 it was announced Snodgrass had left the club by mutual consent, having last started a game in a 3–0 home victory against Bristol City in October.

=== Luton Town ===
In February 2022, Snodgrass signed for Luton Town until the end of the 2021–22 season.

Snodgrass left Luton at the end of the 2021–22 season. In August 2022 he was offered a contract by Motherwell.

=== Heart of Midlothian ===
Snodgrass signed a one-year contract with Scottish Premiership club Heart of Midlothian on 6 September 2022. He was released by Hearts in April 2023, soon after Steven Naismith replaced Robbie Neilson as manager.

On 16 January 2024, Snodgrass confirmed that he had retired from professional football.

== International career ==
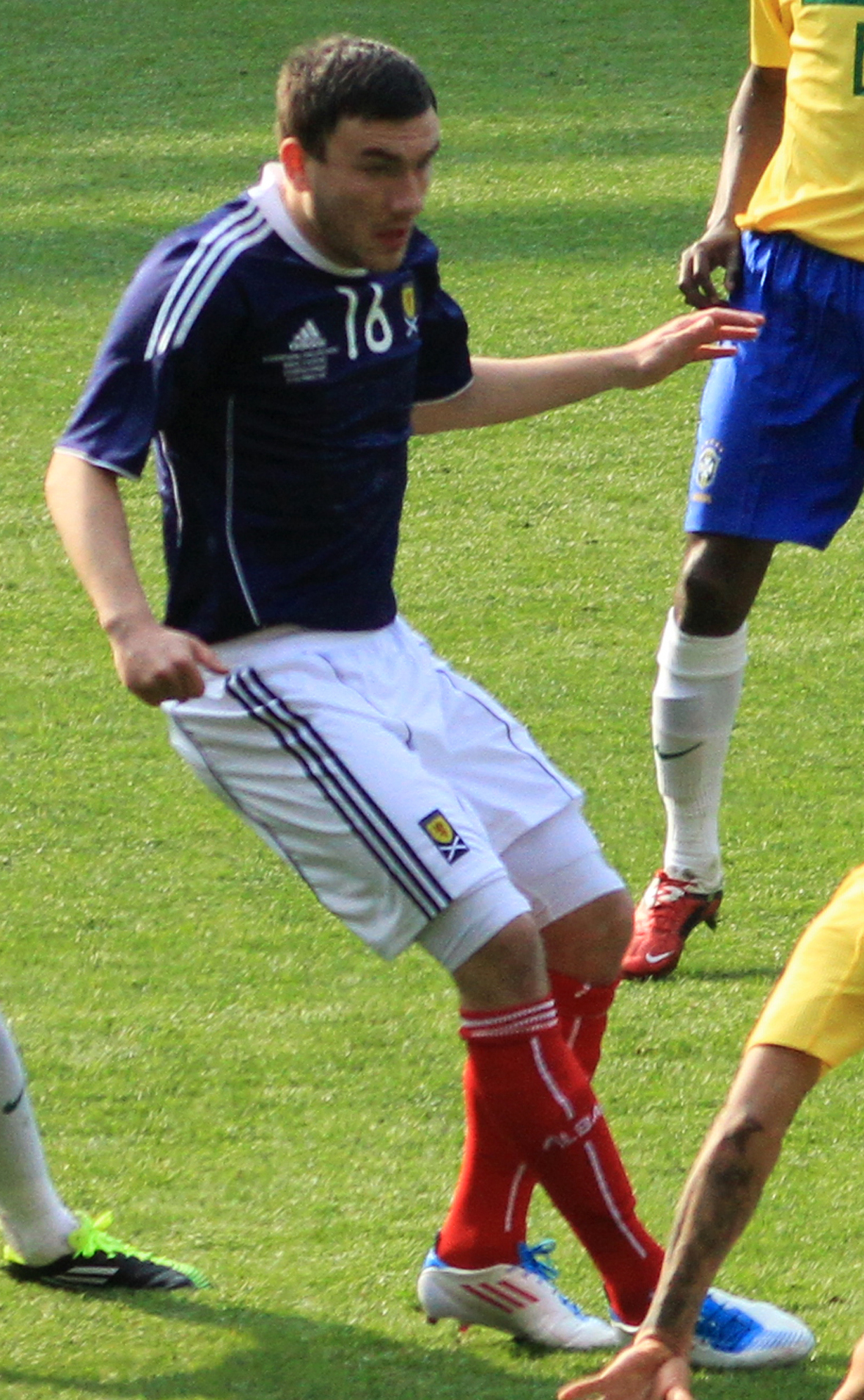
Snodgrass playing for Scotland in 2011

Snodgrass played for the Scotland under-19, under-20 and under-21 teams. He was part of the squad that reached the final of the 2006 European Under-19 Championships in Poland, although Snodgrass was suspended for the final itself. Snodgrass also played for Scotland under-20 in the 2007 FIFA U-20 World Cup in Canada It was his form in this tournament that led to Barcelona showing interest in Snodgrass.

Leeds' involvement in the play-offs against Millwall in 2009 meant that Snodgrass was unavailable to play in a Scotland B international.

Snodgrass was called up to the senior Scotland squad by George Burley for the first time for their friendly against Japan in October 2009. He was forced to withdraw from the squad due to a knee injury. Snodgrass made his full international debut on 9 February 2011, coming on as a substitute against Northern Ireland in a 2011 Nations Cup match. Snodgrass was called up to the Scotland squad to face Brazil on 21 March 2011, coming on as a second-half substitute. Scotland lost the game 2–0. Snodgrass was ruled out of Scotland's Nations Cup matches against Wales and the Republic of Ireland with a back injury.

On 2 August 2011, Snodgrass was called up to the squad for a friendly against Denmark. He made his first start for Scotland against Denmark and also scored his first international goal in this game. On 7 June 2013, during 2014 FIFA World Cup qualifying, he scored the only goal in a 1–0 win against Croatia, inflicting their first competitive defeat at home since they lost 4–1 to England in 2008.

The kneecap injury that Snodgrass suffered in August 2014 caused him to miss the whole of the UEFA Euro 2016 qualifying campaign. He was recalled to the national squad for a friendly match against the Czech Republic in March 2016. In the first match of 2018 FIFA World Cup qualification, Snodgrass scored a hat-trick in a 5–1 win against Malta.

On 16 October 2019, Snodgrass retired from international football with 28 caps and 7 goals.

== Personal life ==
Snodgrass has a daughter, Sienna, with his girlfriend Denise.

On 24 January 2011, an arrest warrant was issued for Snodgrass after he failed to turn up to court regarding an alleged driving offence. A spokesman for Leeds United said that the non-appearance was due to a misunderstanding and that Snodgrass was working with the judicial authorities to resolve the matter.

On 3 March 2017, another arrest warrant was issued for him after he failed to attend his trial for allegedly driving in Glasgow with a baby being held in the arms of a passenger. His defence lawyer said that Snodgrass' absence was due to a misunderstanding.

== Career statistics ==
=== Club ===
Appearances and goals by club, season and competition
Club	Season	League			National cup		League cup		Other		Total	
Club	Season	Division	Apps	Goals	Apps	Goals	Apps	Goals	Apps	Goals	Apps	Goals
Livingston	2004–05	Scottish Premier League	16	2	1	1	1	0	0	0	18	3
Livingston	2005–06	Scottish Premier League	26	4	2	0	2	0	0	0	30	4
Livingston	2006–07	Scottish First Division	6	0	1	0	0	0	0	0	7	0
Livingston	2007–08	Scottish First Division	31	9	3	0	2	1	1 (Note: Appearance in Scottish Challenge Cup)	0	37	10
Livingston	Total		79	15	7	1	5	1	1	0	92	17
Stirling Albion (loan)	2006–07	Scottish Second Division	12	5	0	0	0	0	3 (Note: Appearances in Scottish Second Division play-offs)	2	15	7
Leeds United	2008–09	League One	42	9	2	0	3	2	4 (Note: Two appearances in Football League Trophy, two in League One play-offs)	0	51	11
Leeds United	2009–10	League One	44	7	6	0	3	2	4 (Note: Appearances in Football League Trophy)	1	57	10
Leeds United	2010–11	Championship	39	6	2	1	0	0	0	0	41	7
Leeds United	2011–12	Championship	43	13	0	0	1	0	0	0	44	13
Leeds United	Total		168	35	10	1	7	4	8	1	193	41
Norwich City	2012–13	Premier League	37	6	1	1	2	0	0	0	40	7
Norwich City	2013–14	Premier League	30	6	2	1	2	0	0	0	34	7
Norwich City	Total		67	12	3	2	4	0	0	0	74	14
Hull City	2014–15	Premier League	1	0	0	0	0	0	2 (Note: Appearances in UEFA Europa League)	0	3	0
Hull City	2015–16	Championship	24	4 (Note: In the match on 15 April 2015 against Wolverhampton Wanderers the final goal was originally credited to be an own goal by goalkeeper Carl Ikeme, this was later officially credited to Snodgrass.)	1	1	1	0	3 (Note: Appearances in Championship play-offs)	0	29	5
Hull City	2016–17	Premier League	20	7	1	0	3	2	—		24	9
Hull City	Total		45	11	2	1	4	2	5	0	56	14
West Ham United	2016–17	Premier League	15	0	—		—		—		15	0
West Ham United	2018–19	Premier League	33	2	2	0	3	2	—		38	4
West Ham United	2019–20	Premier League	24	5	1	0	2	0	—		27	5
West Ham United	2020–21	Premier League	3	0	—		3	2	—		6	2
West Ham United	Total		75	7	3	0	8	4	0	0	86	11
Aston Villa (loan)	2017–18	Championship	40	7	0	0	0	0	3	0	43	7
West Bromwich Albion	2020–21	Premier League	8	0	0	0	0	0	—		8	0
West Bromwich Albion	2021–22	Championship	6	0	0	0	1	0	0	0	7	0
West Bromwich Albion	Total		14	0	0	0	1	0	0	0	15	0
Luton Town	2021–22	Championship	8	0	1	0	0	0	2	0	11	0
Heart of Midlothian	2022–23	Scottish Premiership	23	1	2	0	0	0	0	0	25	1
Career total			531	93	28	5	29	11	22	3	610	112

=== International ===
Appearances and goals by national team and year
National team	Year	Apps	Goals
Scotland	2011	4	1
Scotland	2012	3	0
Scotland	2013	8	2
Scotland	2016	6	3
Scotland	2017	4	1
Scotland	2018	1	0
Scotland	2019	2	0
Total		28	7

Scotland score listed first, score column indicates score after each Snodgrass goal.

List of international goals scored by Robert Snodgrass
No.	Date	Venue	Opponent	Score	Result	Competition
1	10 August 2011	Hampden Park, Glasgow, Scotland	Denmark	2–1	2–1	Friendly
2	7 June 2013	Stadion Maksimir, Zagreb, Croatia	Croatia	1–0	1–0	2014 FIFA World Cup qualification
3	15 October 2013	Hampden Park, Glasgow, Scotland	Croatia	1–0	2–0	2014 FIFA World Cup qualification
4	4 September 2016	Ta' Qali National Stadium, Mdina, Malta	Malta	1–0	5–1	2018 FIFA World Cup qualification
5	4 September 2016	Ta' Qali National Stadium, Mdina, Malta	Malta	3–1	5–1	2018 FIFA World Cup qualification
6	4 September 2016	Ta' Qali National Stadium, Mdina, Malta	Malta	5–1	5–1	2018 FIFA World Cup qualification
7	8 October 2017	Stožice Stadium, Ljubljana, Slovenia	Slovenia	2–2	2–2	2018 FIFA World Cup qualification

== Honours ==
Stirling Albion

- Scottish Football League First Division play-offs: 2007

Leeds United

- Football League One runner-up: 2009–10

Hull City

- Football League Championship play-offs: 2016

Individual

- PFA Player of the Month (League One): August/September 2009
- PFA Team of the Year (League One): 2009–10
- LUFC Regional Members Clubs' Player of the Year: 2008–09
- Leeds United Supporters' Player of the Year: 2011–12
- Leeds United Players' Player of the Year: 2011–12
- Norwich City Supporters' Player of the Year: 2013–14
- SFWA International Player of the Year: 2013–14, 2016–17

== See also ==
- List of Scotland national football team hat-tricks
