= List of Leeds United F.C. records and statistics =

This article lists the records of Leeds United Football Club.

== Honours ==
=== Domestic ===
League

- First Division
  - Champions: 1968–69, 1973–74, 1991–92
  - Runners-up: 1964–65, 1965–66, 1969–70, 1970–71, 1971–72
- Second Division/Championship
  - Champions: 1923–24, 1963–64, 1989–90, 2019–20, 2024–25
  - Runners-up: 1927–28, 1931–32, 1955–56
  - Play-off runners-up: 1987, 2006, 2024
- League One
  - Runners-up: 2009–10
  - Play-off runners-up: 2008

Cup

- FA Cup
  - Winners: 1971–72
  - Runners-up: 1964–65, 1969–70, 1972–73
- League Cup
  - Winners: 1967–68
  - Runners-up: 1995–96
- FA Charity Shield
  - Winners: 1969, 1992
  - Runners-up: 1974

=== European ===
- European Cup
  - Runners-up: 1974–75
- European Cup Winners' Cup
  - Runners-up: 1972–73
- Inter-Cities Fairs Cup
  - Winners: 1967–68, 1970–71
  - Runners-up: 1966–67
- Inter-Cities Fairs Cup Trophy play-off
  - Runners-up: 1971

== Record attendance ==
- 57,892 v Sunderland, FA Cup Rd. 5 replay, 15 March 1967

== Record gate receipts ==
- £1,230,000.00 Leeds United v Manchester United, Premier League 12 February 2023

== Record victories ==
- Overall: 10–0 v Lyn Oslo, European Cup Rd.1, 1st leg, 17 September 1969
- League: 8–0 v Leicester City, Div. One, 7 April 1934
- FA Cup: 8–1 v Crystal Palace, Rd.3, 11 January 1930
- League Cup: 6–0 v Leicester City, Rd.3, 9 October 2001
- League Trophy: 3–1 v Grimsby Town, Quarter-Final, 10 November 2009
- Europe: 10–0 v Lyn Oslo, European Cup Rd.1, 1st leg, 17 September 1969
- Home: 10–0 v Lyn Oslo, European Cup Rd.1, 1st leg, 17 September 1969
- Away: 9–0 v Spora Luxembourg, Inter Cities Fairs Cup Rd.1, 1st leg, 3 October 1967

== Record defeats ==
- Overall: 1–8 v Stoke City, Div. One, 27 August 1934, 0–7 v Arsenal, Rd.2, 4 September 1979 & 0–7 v West Ham United, Rd.3, 7 November 1966 & 0–7 vs Manchester City, Rd.17, Premier League, 14 December 2021
- League: 1–8 v Stoke City, Div. One, 27 August 1934
- FA Cup: 2–7 v Middlesbrough, Rd.3, 2nd leg, 9 January 1946
- League Cup: 0–7 v Arsenal, Rd.2, Sept 4 1979 & 0–7 v West Ham United, Rd.3, 7 November 1966
- League Trophy: 2–4 v Rotherham United, Area 2nd Round, 8 October 2008
- Europe: 0–4 v Lierse S.K., UEFA Cup, Rd.1, 2nd leg, 29 September 1971 & 0–4 v Barcelona, UEFA Champions League, 1st Group Stage, Matchday 1, 13 September 2000
- Away: 1–8 v Stoke City, Div. One, 27 August 1934, 0–7 v Arsenal, Rd.2, 4 September 1979, 0–7 v West Ham United, Rd.3, 7 November 1966 & 0–7 v Manchester City, Premier League, Rd.17, 14 December 2021

== Sequence records ==
=== Most League goals ===
- Div. Two (98) 1927–28

=== Most League goals in a season ===
- John Charles (43) Div. Two 1953–54

=== Best undefeated start to a season ===
- (29) 25 August 1973 – 23 February 1974

=== Most matches undefeated ===
- (34) 19 October 1968 – 30 August 1969

=== Most home matches undefeated ===
- (39) 4 May 1968 – 28 March 1970

=== Most away matches undefeated ===
- (17) 19 October 1968 – 30 August 1969

=== Longest run without a home win ===
- (10) 16 January 1982 – 15 May 1982

=== Longest run without an away win ===
- (26) 18 March 1939 – 30 August 1947

=== Most League wins (dates inclusive) ===
- (9) 26 September 1931 – 21 November 1931
- (9) 1 January 2024 - 23 February 2024

=== Most League defeats (dates inclusive) ===
- (6) 26 April 1947 – 26 May 1947

=== Most League matches without a win ===
- (17) 18 January 1947 – 23 August 1947

=== Most home wins ===
- (15) 24 January 2009 – 19 September 2009

=== Most away wins ===
- (8) 21 September 1963 – 28 December 1963

=== Most League goals in a career ===
- Peter Lorimer 168 (1965–79 & 1983–86)

=== Most goals in a match ===
- Gordon Hodgson: 5 v Leicester City, Division One 1 October 1938

== Record appearances ==
1. Jack Charlton 773
2. Billy Bremner 772
3. Paul Reaney 749
4. Norman Hunter 726
5. Paul Madeley 725
6. Peter Lorimer 703
7. Eddie Gray 577
8. Gary Kelly 531
9. Johnny Giles 527
10. Gary Sprake 507

== Record goalscorers ==
1. Peter Lorimer 238
2. John Charles 157
3. Allan Clarke 151
4. Tom Jennings 117
5. Billy Bremner 115
6. Johnny Giles 114
7. Mick Jones 111
8. Charlie Keetley 110
9. Jack Charlton 96
10. Russell Wainscoat 93

== Most capped player whilst at Leeds United ==
- Lucas Radebe (South Africa national football team) 69

== Oldest player ==
- Eddie Burbanks (41 years, 23 days v Hull City, 24 April 1954)

== Youngest player ==
- Peter Lorimer (15 years, 289 days v Southampton, 29 September 1962)

== Most players used in a season ==
- 44 – 2006–07 season

== Overall record by competition ==
This is the all-time record in all competitions.

Only completed season results up to the end of the 2024–25 season are included.

Competition		Home					Away					Neutral				
	P	W	D	L	F	A	W	D	L	F	A	W	D	L	F	A
Premier League / First Division	2,174	581	274	232	1,950	1,157	299	275	513	1,281	1,838					
Championship / Second Division	1,834	506	234	177	1,575	862	271	244	402	1,116	1,410					
League One / Third Division	138	46	12	11	131	57	32	15	22	95	74					
Football League Play-Offs	18	3	2	2	11	8	3	1	3	6	4	0	0	4	1	7
FA Cup	270	62	25	27	233	130	42	33	60	171	211	7	5	9	24	23
Football League Cup	197	60	16	32	199	129	32	17	37	127	129	2	0	1	2	3
Champions League / European Cup	40	13	3	3	49	14	8	3	8	26	25	1	0	1	2	3
UEFA Cup Winners Cup	9	4	0	0	9	0	1	3	0	4	2	0	0	1	0	1
Europa League / UEFA Cup	46	13	4	6	38	23	7	6	10	28	25					
Inter Cities Fairs Cup	54	18	7	2	59	18	10	10	7	34	24					
Charity Shield	3	1	0	0	2	1	0	0	0	0	0	1	1	0	5	4
Full Member's Cup	17	5	2	2	16	10	2	1	5	8	19					
Football League Trophy	9	4	0	2	11	7	2	0	1	6	6					
TOTAL	4,809	1,316	579	496	4,283	2,416	709	608	1,068	2,902	3,767	11	6	16	34	41

== League record club by club ==
This is the all-time record against clubs in the League.

Only completed season league results up to the end of the 2024–25 season are included.

Opponent		Home					Away				
	P	W	D	L	F	A	W	D	L	F	A
AFC Bournemouth	14	7	0	0	18	6	3	2	2	9	10
Arsenal	106	25	15	13	85	66	13	10	30	58	103
Aston Villa	92	18	18	10	67	44	12	13	21	56	72
Barnsley	60	15	9	6	51	31	9	7	14	39	49
Birmingham City	102	26	13	12	75	39	10	12	29	51	91
Blackburn Rovers	100	25	13	12	86	59	19	11	20	69	71
Blackpool	44	12	7	3	43	23	5	6	11	28	39
Bolton Wanderers	60	17	6	7	60	47	9	7	14	37	56
Bradford City	20	7	3	0	20	8	4	4	2	9	9
Bradford (Park Avenue)	10	4	1	0	12	4	2	1	2	5	8
Brentford	42	10	8	3	31	17	4	8	9	23	37
Brighton & Hove Albion	50	11	8	6	39	30	6	6	13	22	34
Bristol City	40	14	3	3	33	16	11	6	3	28	13
Bristol Rovers	16	4	4	0	13	8	2	3	3	16	20
Burnley	64	19	6	7	60	35	13	7	12	44	45
Burton Albion	4	2	0	0	7	0	1	0	1	3	3
Bury	42	13	3	5	38	18	5	7	9	31	39
Cambridge United	4	2	0	0	5	2	0	2	0	2	2
Cardiff City	56	11	9	8	41	27	5	6	17	22	38
Carlisle United	16	4	3	1	14	8	4	2	2	14	11
Charlton Athletic	50	12	7	6	42	24	11	3	11	31	35
Chelsea	96	29	13	6	92	35	11	13	24	50	82
Cheltenham Town	4	1	0	1	3	2	1	0	1	1	1
Chesterfield	10	3	2	0	9	3	0	1	4	3	11
Colchester United	6	2	0	1	6	2	2	0	1	4	3
Coventry City	84	30	10	2	86	27	15	12	15	53	57
Crewe Alexandra	8	2	1	1	7	5	2	1	1	6	5
Crystal Palace	58	19	4	6	50	27	5	12	12	23	36
Derby County	112	32	13	11	91	47	18	14	24	76	92
Doncaster Rovers	22	6	3	2	20	10	5	4	2	14	10
Everton	110	36	14	5	105	50	12	17	26	50	91
Exeter City	2	1	0	0	2	1	0	0	1	0	2
Fulham	60	14	9	7	48	29	10	6	14	42	44
Gillingham	6	2	1	0	7	3	0	1	2	4	6
Grimsby Town	38	12	5	2	34	11	4	5	10	21	35
Hartlepool United	6	3	0	0	9	2	1	2	0	4	3
Hereford United	2	1	0	0	1	0	0	0	1	0	2
Huddersfield Town	72	16	9	11	61	42	9	9	18	39	55
Hull City	56	18	6	4	55	25	9	8	11	33	34
Ipswich Town	76	22	10	6	68	39	12	8	18	49	61
Leicester City	124	32	15	15	126	77	16	20	26	80	106
Lincoln City	12	5	0	1	20	7	1	3	2	5	8
Liverpool	106	17	15	21	69	79	8	11	34	39	106
Luton Town	46	13	6	4	37	21	4	11	8	24	35
Manchester City	100	25	9	16	78	64	13	9	28	51	94
Manchester United	98	15	16	18	63	63	8	18	23	42	83
Middlesbrough	100	28	11	11	99	52	14	17	19	53	75
Millwall	40	15	1	4	39	21	5	3	12	20	29
Milton Keynes Dons	6	2	1	0	7	2	2	0	1	4	4
Nelson	2	1	0	0	1	0	0	0	1	1	3
Newcastle United	94	23	11	13	87	51	12	10	25	56	83
Northampton Town	8	3	1	0	12	1	1	1	2	6	5
Norwich City	58	16	7	6	44	35	9	7	13	41	51
Nottingham Forest	96	22	16	10	73	49	9	19	20	56	67
Notts County	32	12	3	1	40	7	5	3	8	20	25
Oldham Athletic	36	11	4	3	33	11	4	8	6	24	29
Orient	22	7	3	1	16	7	4	3	4	12	13
Oxford United	8	3	1	0	8	2	2	0	2	9	10
Peterborough United	6	2	1	0	8	3	2	0	1	5	5
Plymouth Argyle	42	14	6	1	45	17	8	4	9	30	33
Port Vale	20	7	2	1	20	6	6	2	2	12	10
Portsmouth	54	16	7	4	50	29	5	10	12	33	57
Preston North End	58	14	6	9	50	40	7	7	15	34	56
Queens Park Rangers	60	15	8	7	53	27	8	9	13	30	41
Reading	28	7	4	3	22	14	5	5	4	13	10
Rotherham United	38	11	3	5	37	19	7	2	10	27	31
Scunthorpe United	12	4	1	1	12	8	4	0	2	12	7
Sheffield United	78	20	10	9	69	41	11	12	16	51	57
Sheffield Wednesday	100	25	15	10	85	52	17	11	22	63	83
Shrewsbury Town	14	4	2	1	11	6	3	2	2	12	12
South Shields	10	2	1	2	6	4	3	0	2	8	6
Southampton	96	27	13	8	77	37	20	8	20	74	68
Southend United	8	4	0	0	10	1	0	2	2	1	3
Stockport County	10	4	0	1	9	2	2	1	2	10	9
Stoke City	92	29	11	6	89	32	16	7	23	64	96
Sunderland	88	23	12	9	74	48	15	7	22	53	71
Swansea Town	42	15	4	2	52	21	7	4	10	38	43
Swindon Town	16	5	2	1	14	6	4	2	2	15	10
Tottenham Hotspur	94	22	14	11	72	55	9	12	26	55	86
Tranmere Rovers	6	2	0	1	6	3	2	0	1	7	4
Walsall	12	5	0	1	14	3	2	3	1	8	5
Watford	26	6	3	4	23	23	6	4	3	19	15
West Bromwich Albion	84	21	12	9	73	43	14	7	21	55	69
West Ham United	104	33	11	8	109	55	15	17	20	73	92
Wigan Athletic	12	1	1	4	4	8	3	1	2	6	6
Wimbledon	24	8	4	0	31	10	3	4	5	11	12
Wolverhampton Wanderers	94	26	10	11	73	41	13	11	23	54	81
Wycombe Wanderers	2	0	1	0	1	1	1	0	0	1	0
Yeovil Town	8	4	0	0	11	0	3	1	0	6	3
TOTAL	4,146	1,133	520	420	3,656	2,076	602	534	937	2,492	3,322

=== Football League play-offs ===
Opponent		Home					Away					Neutral				
	P	W	D	L	F	A	W	D	L	F	A	W	D	L	F	A
Carlisle United	2	0	0	1	1	2	1	0	0	2	0					
Charlton Athletic	3	1	0	0	1	0	0	0	1	0	1	0	0	1	1	2
Derby County	2	0	0	1	2	4	1	0	0	1	0					
Doncaster Rovers	1	0	0	0	0	0	0	0	0	0	0	0	0	1	0	1
Millwall	2	0	1	0	1	1	0	0	1	0	1					
Norwich City	2	1	0	0	4	0	0	1	0	0	0					
Oldham Athletic	2	1	0	0	1	0	0	0	1	1	2					
Preston North End	2	0	1	0	1	1	1	0	0	2	0					
Southampton	1	0	0	0	0	0	0	0	0	0	0	0	0	1	0	1
Watford	1	0	0	0	0	0	0	0	0	0	0	0	0	1	0	3
TOTAL	18	3	2	2	11	8	3	1	3	6	4	0	0	4	1	7

== FA Cup record club by club ==
This is the all-time record against clubs in the FA Cup.

Only completed FA Cup campaign results up to the end of the 2024–25 season are included.

Opponent		Home					Away					Neutral				
	P	W	D	L	F	A	W	D	L	F	A	W	D	L	F	A
AFC Bournemouth	1	1	0	0	3	1	0	0	0	0	0					
Accrington Stanley	1	0	0	0	0	0	1	0	0	3	1					
Arsenal	17	0	2	4	7	14	1	5	4	6	9	1	0	0	1	0
Aston Villa	4	0	0	1	1	2	0	0	3	3	8					
Barnsley	3	2	0	0	5	0	0	1	0	1	1					
Birmingham City	6	1	1	0	4	3	2	0	1	4	5	1	0	0	3	0
Blackpool	1	0	0	0	0	0	0	0	1	0	4					
Bolton Wanderers	7	0	2	0	1	1	3	0	2	7	9					
Boothtown	1	1	0	0	5	2	0	0	0	0	0					
Bradford (Park Avenue)	2	2	0	0	6	1	0	0	0	0	0					
Brentford	1	0	0	0	0	0	0	0	1	1	2					
Brighton & Hove Albion	1	0	0	0	0	0	1	0	0	2	1					
Bristol City	3	1	0	1	2	1	0	1	0	1	1					
Bristol Rovers	1	1	0	0	4	1	0	0	0	0	0					
Bury	2	2	0	0	9	2	0	0	0	0	0					
Cambridge United	1	0	0	0	0	0	1	0	0	2	1					
Cardiff City	10	3	0	3	15	10	2	1	1	6	4					
Carlisle United	1	0	0	0	0	0	1	0	0	5	2					
Charlton Athletic	3	0	1	0	1	1	1	0	1	4	3					
Chelsea	9	0	1	0	1	1	0	1	3	3	9	0	1	3	4	10
Chester City	1	1	0	0	3	1	0	0	0	0	0					
Colchester United	1	0	0	0	0	0	0	0	1	2	3					
Coventry City	3	0	1	0	1	1	0	0	1	0	1	0	0	1	2	3
Crawley Town	1	0	0	0	0	0	0	0	1	0	3					
Crewe Alexandra	1	1	0	0	3	1	0	0	0	0	0					
Crystal Palace	7	3	0	1	12	2	2	1	0	7	3					
Derby County	6	1	1	0	4	2	3	0	1	7	5					
Everton	7	0	2	1	2	4	1	0	2	2	5	0	0	1	0	1
Exeter City	3	1	0	0	5	1	0	1	1	3	5					
Fulham	1	0	0	0	0	0	0	0	1	0	2					
Gillingham	2	1	0	0	2	1	0	1	0	1	1					
Grimsby Town	1	1	0	0	2	0	0	0	0	0	0					
Harrogate Town	1	1	0	0	1	0	0	0	0	0	0					
Hartlepool United	1	0	0	0	0	0	1	0	0	6	2					
Hereford United	2	0	0	1	0	1	0	1	0	0	0					
Histon	1	0	0	0	0	0	0	0	1	0	1					
Huddersfield Town	3	1	0	1	4	4	0	0	1	0	3					
Ipswich Town	5	0	1	1	1	2	0	1	0	0	0	0	1	1	2	3
Kettering Town	2	1	0	0	5	1	0	1	0	1	1					
Leeds Steelworks	1	1	0	0	7	0	0	0	0	0	0					
Liverpool	7	1	1	1	2	2	0	1	2	0	6	0	0	1	1	2
Luton Town	1	0	0	0	0	0	0	0	1	1	5					
Manchester City	6	2	0	1	3	2	1	0	2	5	7					
Manchester United	10	0	0	1	0	1	1	0	2	2	7	2	3	1	3	2
Mansfield Town	1	1	0	0	2	0	0	0	0	0	0					
Middlesbrough	5	1	1	0	5	4	1	0	2	5	12					
Millwall	1	0	0	1	0	2	0	0	0	0	0					
Newcastle United	2	1	0	0	4	1	1	0	0	3	0					
Newport County	2	0	0	1	1	3	0	0	1	1	2					
Northampton Town	2	0	1	0	1	1	1	0	0	5	2					
Norwich City	6	1	1	1	7	5	0	2	0	4	4	1	0	0	5	0
Nottingham Forest	4	1	0	1	3	5	0	0	2	0	5					
Notts County	1	0	0	0	0	0	1	0	0	1	0					
Oldham Athletic	2	1	0	0	3	2	1	0	0	2	0					
Oxford United	3	1	0	1	6	3	0	1	0	2	2					
Peterborough United	3	0	0	0	0	0	2	0	1	7	2					
Plymouth Argyle	3	1	1	0	3	2	1	0	0	4	1					
Port Vale	3	1	1	0	2	0	1	0	0	2	1					
Portsmouth	4	1	0	1	5	4	1	1	0	5	1					
Preston North End	2	1	0	1	3	1	0	0	0	0	0					
Queens Park Rangers	3	1	0	0	2	1	0	0	2	2	5					
Rochdale	2	0	0	0	0	0	1	0	1	2	2					
Rotherham United	3	2	0	0	5	2	0	1	0	0	0					
Rushden & Diamonds	2	1	0	0	3	1	0	1	0	0	0					
Scunthorpe United	4	0	1	0	1	1	1	1	1	5	5					
Sheffield United	3	1	0	0	1	0	0	0	2	1	4					
Sheffield Wednesday	3	0	0	1	1	3	0	1	1	1	3					
Shrewsbury Town	1	1	0	0	2	0	0	0	0	0	0					
Southport	1	1	0	0	3	0	0	0	0	0	0					
Stoke City	2	2	0	0	4	1	0	0	0	0	0					
Sunderland	6	1	1	0	4	3	0	1	1	1	2	1	0	1	2	2
Sutton United	2	0	0	0	0	0	1	0	1	6	1					
Swansea Town	1	1	0	0	2	1	0	0	0	0	0					
Swindon Town	4	1	0	0	4	0	2	0	1	5	3					
Telford United	1	0	0	0	0	0	1	0	0	2	1					
Torquay United	2	0	1	0	2	2	0	0	1	0	4					
Tottenham Hotspur	9	2	2	1	9	9	0	1	3	2	6					
Tranmere Rovers	2	1	0	0	4	0	0	1	0	0	0					
Walsall	2	1	0	0	5	2	0	1	0	1	1					
Watford	1	0	0	0	0	0	0	0	1	0	1					
West Bromwich Albion	6	2	0	0	7	0	0	1	3	5	10					
West Ham United	4	1	0	0	1	0	0	1	2	2	7					
Wigan Athletic	3	0	1	0	3	3	1	1	0	3	1					
Wimbledon	2	0	1	0	0	0	1	0	0	1	0					
Wolverhampton Wanderers	8	2	0	1	4	2	2	2	0	6	3	1	0	0	1	0
TOTAL	270	62	25	27	233	130	42	33	60	171	211	7	5	9	24	23

== League Cup record club by club ==
This is the all-time record against clubs in the League Cup.

Only completed League Cup campaign results up to the end of the 2024–25 season are included.

Opponent		Home					Away					Neutral				
	P	W	D	L	F	A	W	D	L	F	A	W	D	L	F	A
Accrington Stanley	1	1	0	0	2	1	0	0	0	0	0					
Arsenal	4	0	1	0	1	1	0	0	2	0	9	1	0	0	1	0
Aston Villa	9	2	0	4	10	12	0	1	1	1	2	0	0	1	0	3
Barnet	1	1	0	0	3	1	0	0	0	0	0					
Barnsley	1	1	0	0	3	1	0	0	0	0	0					
Birmingham City	2	1	0	0	3	0	1	0	0	2	1					
Blackburn Rovers	5	3	0	0	4	1	0	0	2	0	7					
Blackpool	2	0	1	0	0	0	1	0	0	3	1					
Bolton Wanderers	2	1	0	0	2	1	1	0	0	3	1					
Bradford City	3	2	0	0	4	2	0	0	1	1	2					
Brentford	1	1	0	0	4	1	0	0	0	0	0					
Bristol City	3	2	0	0	5	2	0	0	1	1	2					
Burnley	2	1	0	0	4	0	0	1	0	2	2					
Bury	2	1	0	0	3	0	1	0	0	2	1					
Charlton Athletic	1	1	0	0	1	0	0	0	0	0	0					
Chelsea	4	0	1	2	2	8	0	0	1	0	2					
Chester City	5	1	0	1	1	1	2	0	1	9	6					
Chesterfield	2	1	0	0	2	1	1	0	0	4	0					
Colchester United	1	1	0	0	4	0	0	0	0	0	0					
Crewe Alexandra	1	1	0	0	3	0	0	0	0	0	0					
Crystal Palace	3	2	0	0	6	1	0	0	1	1	2					
Darlington	3	0	1	0	2	2	2	0	0	3	0					
Derby County	6	2	0	0	5	2	2	1	1	3	2					
Doncaster Rovers	3	0	0	0	0	0	2	1	0	6	3					
Everton	3	2	0	0	6	2	1	0	0	4	1					
Fleetwood Town	1	0	0	0	0	0	0	1	0	2	2					
Fulham	2	0	0	0	0	0	1	1	0	1	0					
Gillingham	2	1	0	0	3	2	1	0	0	2	1					
Hartlepool United	2	2	0	0	7	4	0	0	0	0	0					
Huddersfield Town	7	4	1	1	10	7	0	1	0	1	1					
Hull City	1	0	1	0	1	1	0	0	0	0	0					
Ipswich Town	4	1	0	1	3	3	0	0	2	0	5					
Leicester City	7	1	0	1	4	2	1	1	3	8	6					
Lincoln City	1	1	0	0	4	0	0	0	0	0	0					
Liverpool	4	0	0	2	0	2	0	1	1	2	4					
Luton Town	4	2	0	1	7	4	1	0	0	1	0					
Macclesfield Town	1	0	0	0	0	0	1	0	0	1	0					
Manchester City	1	0	0	0	0	0	0	0	1	1	3					
Manchester United	5	0	0	4	3	10	0	0	1	1	2					
Mansfield Town	3	1	0	1	5	2	0	1	0	0	0					
Middlesbrough	1	0	0	1	0	3	0	0	0	0	0					
Newcastle United	4	1	0	1	1	1	1	0	1	4	3					
Newport County	1	1	0	0	5	1	0	0	0	0	0					
Norwich City	1	0	1	0	2	2	0	0	0	0	0					
Nottingham Forest	2	0	0	1	1	3	0	0	1	2	4					
Notts County	3	0	1	1	0	1	1	0	0	3	2					
Oldham Athletic	8	2	1	2	7	5	0	0	3	5	9					
Oxford United	3	1	1	0	4	1	0	0	1	1	4					
Peterborough United	2	1	0	0	3	1	1	0	0	2	1					
Port Vale	1	1	0	0	4	1	0	0	0	0	0					
Portsmouth	2	0	0	0	0	0	0	0	2	1	5					
Preston North End	3	1	0	1	3	2	0	1	0	1	1					
Queens Park Rangers	2	0	0	0	0	0	2	0	0	5	0					
Reading	2	1	0	1	4	4	0	0	0	0	0					
Rochdale	1	0	0	0	0	0	1	0	0	3	0					
Rotherham United	3	0	0	1	1	2	1	1	0	3	1					
Salford City	2	0	0	0	0	0	1	1	0	4	1					
Scunthorpe United	4	2	0	0	7	1	0	2	0	2	2					
Sheffield United	3	0	0	0	0	0	1	0	2	5	4					
Shrewsbury Town	2	2	0	0	6	1	0	0	0	0	0					
Southampton	4	1	1	0	5	2	0	0	2	4	6					
Southend United	1	0	0	1	1	3	0	0	0	0	0					
Stoke City	4	1	1	0	4	2	1	0	1	4	3					
Sunderland	3	0	0	1	1	2	1	0	1	3	2					
Swansea Town	1	1	0	0	2	0	0	0	0	0	0					
Swindon Town	2	1	1	0	3	2	0	0	0	0	0					
Tranmere Rovers	2	1	0	0	3	1	0	0	1	2	3					
Walsall	2	0	1	0	0	0	1	0	0	3	0					
Watford	3	1	0	1	2	5	0	0	1	1	2					
West Bromwich Albion	4	0	1	1	2	4	0	1	0	0	0	1	0	0	1	0
West Ham United	3	0	0	1	0	1	0	1	1	0	7					
Wolverhampton Wanderers	1	0	0	0	0	0	0	0	1	0	1					
York City	2	0	1	0	1	1	1	0	0	4	0					
TOTAL	197	60	16	32	199	129	32	17	37	127	129	2	0	1	2	3

== European record club by club ==
This is the all-time record against clubs in the European Competitions.

Only completed European campaign results up to the end of the 2024–25 season are included.

=== European Cup / Champions League ===
Opponent		Home					Away					Neutral				
	P	W	D	L	F	A	W	D	L	F	A	W	D	L	F	A
AC Milan	2	1	0	0	1	0	0	1	0	1	1					
Anderlecht	4	2	0	0	5	1	2	0	0	5	1					
Barcelona	4	1	1	0	3	2	0	1	1	1	5					
Bayern Munich	1	0	0	0	0	0	0	0	0	0	0	0	0	1	0	2
Beşiktaş	2	1	0	0	6	0	0	1	0	0	0					
Celtic	2	0	0	1	0	1	0	0	1	1	2					
Deportivo La Coruña	2	1	0	0	3	0	0	0	1	0	2					
Zürich	2	1	0	0	4	1	0	0	1	1	2					
Ferencváros	2	1	0	0	3	0	1	0	0	3	0					
Lazio	2	0	1	0	3	3	1	0	0	1	0					
Rangers	2	0	0	1	1	2	0	0	1	1	2					
Real Madrid	2	0	0	1	0	2	0	0	1	2	3					
SK Lyn Oslo	2	1	0	0	10	0	1	0	0	6	0					
Standard Liège	2	1	0	0	1	0	1	0	0	1	0					
1860 Munich	2	1	0	0	2	1	1	0	0	1	0					
Újpesti Dózsa	2	1	0	0	3	0	1	0	0	2	1					
Valencia	2	0	1	0	0	0	0	0	1	0	3					
VfB Stuttgart	3	1	0	0	4	1	0	0	1	0	3	1	0	0	2	1
TOTAL	40	13	3	3	49	14	8	3	8	26	25	1	0	1	2	3

=== European Cup Winners' Cup ===
Opponent		Home					Away					Neutral				
	P	W	D	L	F	A	W	D	L	F	A	W	D	L	F	A
AC Milan	1	0	0	0	0	0	0	0	0	0	0	0	0	1	0	1
Ankaragücü	2	1	0	0	1	0	0	1	0	1	1					
Carl Zeiss Jena	2	1	0	0	2	0	0	1	0	0	0					
Hajduk Split	2	1	0	0	1	0	0	1	0	0	0					
Rapid Bucharest	2	1	0	0	5	0	1	0	0	3	1					
TOTAL	9	4	0	0	9	0	1	3	0	4	2	0	0	1	0	1

=== Inter Cities Fairs Cup ===
Opponent		Home					Away				
	P	W	D	L	F	A	W	D	L	F	A
Barcelona	1	0	0	0	0	0	0	0	1	1	2
Bologna	2	1	0	0	1	0	0	0	1	0	1
Dundee	2	1	0	0	1	0	0	1	0	1	1
DWS	2	1	0	0	5	1	1	0	0	3	1
Dynamo Dresden	2	1	0	0	1	0	0	0	1	1	2
Dynamo Zagreb	2	0	1	0	0	0	0	0	1	0	2
Ferencváros	2	1	0	0	1	0	0	1	0	0	0
Hannover 96	2	1	0	0	5	1	1	0	0	2	1
Hibernian	2	1	0	0	1	0	0	1	0	1	1
Juventus	2	0	1	0	1	1	0	1	0	2	2
Kilmarnock	2	1	0	0	4	2	0	1	0	0	0
Liverpool	2	0	1	0	0	0	1	0	0	1	0
Napoli	2	1	0	0	2	0	0	0	1	0	2
Partizan Belgrade	2	0	1	0	1	1	1	0	0	2	1
Rangers	2	1	0	0	2	0	0	1	0	0	0
Real Zaragoza	3	1	0	1	3	4	0	0	1	0	1
Sarpsborg	2	1	0	0	5	0	1	0	0	1	0
SC Leipzig	2	0	1	0	0	0	1	0	0	2	1
Sparta Prague	2	1	0	0	6	0	1	0	0	3	2
Spora Luxembourg	2	1	0	0	7	0	1	0	0	9	0
Standard Liège	2	1	0	0	3	2	0	1	0	0	0
Torino	2	1	0	0	2	1	0	1	0	0	0
Újpesti Dózsa	4	1	0	1	4	2	0	1	1	1	3
València	4	0	2	0	2	2	2	0	0	3	0
Vitória Setúbal	2	1	0	0	2	1	0	1	0	1	1
TOTAL	54	18	7	2	59	18	10	10	7	34	24

=== UEFA Cup ===
Opponent		Home					Away				
	P	W	D	L	F	A	W	D	L	F	A
AS Monaco	2	0	0	1	0	1	1	0	0	3	0
AS Roma	4	1	1	0	1	0	0	1	1	0	1
CS Marítimo	4	2	0	0	4	0	0	0	2	0	2
Galatasaray	2	0	1	0	2	2	0	0	1	0	2
Grasshoppers Zürich	2	0	1	0	2	2	1	0	0	2	1
Hapoel Tel Aviv	2	1	0	0	1	0	1	0	0	4	1
Hibernian	2	0	1	0	0	0	0	1	0	0	0
Lierse	2	0	0	1	0	4	1	0	0	2	0
Lokomotiv Moscow	2	1	0	0	4	1	1	0	0	3	0
Málaga	2	0	0	1	1	2	0	1	0	0	0
Metalurh Zaporizhzhya	2	1	0	0	1	0	0	1	0	1	1
Partizan Belgrade	2	1	0	0	1	0	1	0	0	3	1
PSV Eindhoven	4	0	0	2	3	6	0	1	1	0	3
Slavia Prague	2	1	0	0	3	0	0	0	1	1	2
Spartak Moscow	2	1	0	0	1	0	0	0	1	1	2
Strømsgodset	2	1	0	0	6	1	0	1	0	1	1
Troyes	2	1	0	0	4	2	0	0	1	2	3
Universitatea Craiova	2	0	0	1	0	2	0	0	1	0	2
Valletta	2	1	0	0	3	0	1	0	0	4	0
Vitória Setúbal	2	1	0	0	1	0	0	0	1	1	3
TOTAL	46	13	4	6	38	23	7	6	10	28	25

== Other competitions record club by club ==
This is the all-time record against clubs in the other competitions.

Only completed competition campaign results not part of the above-mentioned competitions up to the end of the 2024–25 season are included.

=== Charity Shield ===
Opponent		Home					Neutral				
	P	W	D	L	F	A	W	D	L	F	A
Liverpool	2	0	0	0	0	0	1	1	0	5	4
Manchester City	1	1	0	0	2	1	0	0	0	0	0
TOTAL	3	1	0	0	2	1	1	1	0	5	4

=== Full Members Cup ===
Opponent		Home					Away				
	P	W	D	L	F	A	W	D	L	F	A
Aston Villa	1	0	0	0	0	0	0	0	1	0	2
Barnsley	1	0	0	0	0	0	1	0	0	2	1
Blackburn Rovers	1	1	0	0	1	0	0	0	0	0	0
Bradford City	1	0	0	1	0	1	0	0	0	0	0
Derby County	1	1	0	0	2	1	0	0	0	0	0
Everton	2	0	1	0	3	3	0	0	1	1	3
Manchester City	2	1	0	0	2	0	0	0	1	1	6
Millwall	2	0	0	0	0	0	0	0	2	0	4
Nottingham Forest	1	0	0	1	1	3	0	0	0	0	0
Sheffield United	2	1	1	0	4	1	0	0	0	0	0
Shrewsbury Town	1	1	0	0	3	1	0	0	0	0	0
Stoke City	1	0	0	0	0	0	0	1	0	2	2
Wolverhampton Wanderers	1	0	0	0	0	0	1	0	0	2	1
TOTAL	17	5	2	2	16	10	2	1	5	8	19

=== Football League Trophy ===
Opponent		Home					Away				
	P	W	D	L	F	A	W	D	L	F	A
Accrington Stanley	1	1	0	0	2	0	0	0	0	0	0
Bradford City	1	1	0	0	2	1	0	0	0	0	0
Bury	1	0	0	1	1	2	0	0	0	0	0
Carlisle United	2	0	0	1	1	2	1	0	0	3	2
Darlington	2	1	0	0	2	1	1	0	0	1	0
Grimsby Town	1	1	0	0	3	1	0	0	0	0	0
Rotherham United	1	0	0	0	0	0	0	0	1	2	4
TOTAL	9	4	0	2	11	7	2	0	1	6	6

== Penalty shoot-outs ==
Season	Date	Competition	Round	Opponent	Venue	Result	Score
1973–74	1973-11-07	UEFA Cup	Second round	Hibernian	Away	Won	5–4
1974–75	1974-08-10	FA Charity Shield	Final	Liverpool	Neutral	Lost	5–6
1989–90	1989-12-19	Full Members' Cup	Third round	Stoke City	Away	Won	5–4
1998–99	1998-09-29	UEFA Cup	First round	Marítimo	Away	Won	4–1
1999–2000	1999-12-15	League Cup	Fourth round	Leicester City	Away	Lost	2–4
2003–04	2003-08-24	League Cup	Second round	Swindon Town	Home	Won	4–3
2005–06	2006-01-17	FA Cup	Third round	Wigan Athletic	Home	Lost	2–4
2009–10	2010-02-09	Football League Trophy	Final	Carlisle United	Away	Lost	5–6
2015–16	2015-08-13	League Cup	First round	Doncaster Rovers	Away	Lost	2–4
2016–17	2016-08-10	League Cup	First round	Fleetwood Town	Away	Won	5–4
2016–17	2016-10-25	League Cup	Fourth round	Norwich City	Home	Won	3–2
2017–18	2017-09-19	League Cup	Third round	Burnley	Away	Won	5–3
2019–20	2019-08-27	EFL Cup	Second round	Stoke City	Home	Lost	4–5
2020–21	2020-09-16	EFL Cup	Second round	Hull City	Home	Lost	8–9
2021–22	2021-09-21	EFL Cup	Third round	Fulham	Away	Won	6–5
2023–24	2023-08-29	EFL Cup	Second round	Salford City	Away	Lost	9–8
