= 1945 in association football =

The following are the football (soccer) events of the year 1945 throughout the world.

== Events ==
- 2 April – The Austrian First Division is abandoned after 9 rounds due to the final stages of the war.
- The communist authorities in Yugoslavia ban major football clubs Građanski Zagreb, SK Jugoslavija, HAŠK, HŠK Concordia, FK Slavija and SAŠK Sarajevo among others.
- 25 July – At the annual meeting of The Football League in London, it is agreed to continue regional leagues for a further season despite the end of World War II, as clubs feel unable to cope with the demands of a full League season.
- 26 August – French professional football is resumed for the first time since 1938–39.

== Winners club national championship ==
- Argentina: River Plate
- Chile: Green Cross
- Costa Rica: Alajuelense
- Hungary: Újpest FC
- Ireland: Cork United
- Paraguay: Libertad
- Scotland:
  - Scottish Cup: No competition
- Spain: Barcelona
- Sweden: IFK Norrköping
- Turkey: Fenerbahçe, Harb Okulu
- Uruguay: Peñarol
- Soviet Union Dynamo Moscow

== Births ==
- 20 January – Børge Bach, Danish international footballer (died 2016)
- 14 February – Ladislao Mazurkiewicz, Uruguayan international footballer and manager (died 2013)
- 24 March – Dumitru Antonescu, Romanian international footballer (died 2016)
- 3 April – Gary Sprake, Welsh international footballer (died 2016)
- 1 March – Fidel Uriarte, Spanisch international footballer (died 2016)
- 14 March – Jimmy Tugman, English former professional footballer
- 12 May – Alan Ball, English international footballer (died 2007)
- 14 May – Yochanan Vollach, Israeli international footballer
- 12 June – Pat Jennings, Northern Irish international footballer
- 14 July – Pablo Forlán, Uruguayan international footballer
- 17 July – Nibaldo Alegre, Chilean former football player
- 13 August – Les Barratt, English former professional footballer
- 11 September – Franz Beckenbauer, German international footballer and manager (died 2024)
- 6 October – Graham Bent, Welsh professional footballer (died 2002)
- 20 October – Romeo Benetti, Italian international footballer
- 11 November – Odd Iversen, Norwegian international footballer (died 2014)
- 6 December – Chris Dekker, Dutch footballer and manager
- 22 December – David Kydd, English former footballer

== Deaths ==
- 13 March: Guus van Hecking Colenbrander, Dutch international footballer (born 1887)
- 26 March: Dennis Hodgetts, English international footballer (born 1863)
- 27 March: Ángel Melogno, Uruguayan international midfielder, winner of the 1930 FIFA World Cup. (40)
