= 1969–70 Leeds United A.F.C. season =

Leeds United
1969–70 season
- Chairman: Percy Woodward
- Manager: Don Revie
- Stadium: Elland Road
- First Division: 2nd
- FA Cup: Runners-up
- League Cup: Third round
- European Cup: Semi-final
- FA Charity Shield: Winners

The 1969–70 season was Leeds United's 43th season in the Football League, and their sixth consecutive season in the First Division. Along with the First Division, they competed in the FA Cup, Football League Cup and the European Cup. The season covers the period from 1 July 1969 to 30 June 1970.

== Season summary ==
At the beginning of the 1969–70 season Don Revie completed the signing of Allan Clarke from Leicester City, in the hope of trying to win all three of the major competitions – the League, the FA Cup and the European Cup. In the end, they won none of them – in the League, Leeds were runners up to Everton, and in the European Cup they went out in the semifinals to Celtic. Leeds also reached the FA Cup final and, despite a memorable performance from Eddie Gray, lost to Chelsea after a replay. Revie's Leeds were victims of their own success; FA rules at the time stipulated that a squad of only 20 players could be used, and as a consequence some of the Leeds players took part in 62 competitive games that season. Additionally, FA rules only allowed the use of one substitute, and even then only in case of injury. Other factors, such as fixture congestion and the FA's insistence that Leeds play 9 games in 22 days (the 1969–70 season was foreshortened by England's early departure to Mexico to defend the World Cup) meant that Revie was often forced to field tired players. Geoffrey Green of the Times wrote: "It has been a strenuous slog, greatly pressurised by the loss of a month because of the demands of Mexican acclimatisation for England's players in the World Cup. None have suffered more than Leeds United's players ... At the beginning of March, Leeds looked capable of winning everything and anything, including the General Election. At that time they seemed unbeatable, but in the end a condensed programme of highly competitive fixtures overwhelmed them. Should it be any consolation to them, Leeds have now probably won something more in defeat as good losers than they would have done in many hours of victorious celebrating – universal public sympathy."

At the end of the season, Leeds won only the Charity Shield, although consolation came in the form of Manager of the Year and Player of the Year awards for Revie and Bremner respectively.

== Competitions ==
=== First Division ===
==== League table ====
Pos	Team	Pld	W	D	L	GF	GA	GAv	Pts	Qualification or relegation
1	Everton (C)	42	29	8	5	72	34	2.118	66	Qualification for the European Cup first round
2	Leeds United	42	21	15	6	84	49	1.714	57	Qualification for the Inter-Cities Fairs Cup first round
3	Chelsea	42	21	13	8	70	50	1.400	55	Qualification for the Cup Winners' Cup first round (Note: Chelsea qualified for the Cup Winners' Cup first round as the 1969–70 FA Cup winners.)
4	Derby County	42	22	9	11	64	37	1.730	53	Qualification for the Watney Cup (Note: Derby County and Manchester United qualified for the Watney Cup as the two teams with the most goals that hadn't already qualified for a European competition.)
5	Liverpool	42	20	11	11	65	42	1.548	51	Qualification for the Inter-Cities Fairs Cup first round

Source: World Football
Rules for classification: 1) Points; 2) Goal average; 3) Goals scored
(C) Champions

==== Matches ====
Win	Draw	Loss

First Division match results
Date	Opponent	Venue	Result F–A	Scorers	Attendance
9 August 1969	Tottenham Hotspur	Home	3–1	Bremner, Clarke, Giles (pen.)	35,804
13 August 1969	Arsenal	Home	0–0		37,164
16 August 1969	Nottingham Forest	Away	4–1	Clarke, Giles (pen.), Gray, Lorimer	34,290
19 August 1969	Arsenal	Away	1–1	Lorimer	45,160
23 August 1969	Newcastle United	Home	1–1	Jones	40,403
26 August 1969	Burnley	Away	1–1	Jones	28,000
30 August 1969	Everton	Away	2–3	Bremner, Clarke	51,797
6 September 1969	Manchester United	Home	2–2	Sadler (o.g.), Bremner	44,271
13 September 1969	Sheffield Wednesday	Away	2–1	Clarke, Gray	31,998
20 September 1969	Chelsea	Home	2–0	Giles (pen.), Lorimer	33,130
27 September 1969	Coventry City	Away	2–1	Clarke, Gray	36,091
4 October 1969	Stoke City	Home	2–1	Giles (2, 2 pens.)	35,860
11 October 1969	West Bromwich Albion	Away	1–1	Jones	33,688
18 October 1969	Crystal Palace	Away	1–1	Lorimer	31,910
25 October 1969	Derby County	Home	2–0	Clarke (2)	44,183
29 October 1969	Nottingham Forest	Home	6–1	Lorimer (3), Charlton, Bates, Hibbitt	29,636
1 November 1969	Sunderland	Away	0–0		31,842
8 November 1969	Ipswich Town	Home	4–0	Giles, Jones, Hunter, Gray	26,497
15 November 1969	Southampton	Away	1–1	Jones	23,963
19 November 1969	Sunderland	Home	2–0	Jones, Lorimer	25,890
22 November 1969	Liverpool	Home	1–1	Giles (pen.)	43,293
29 November 1969	Manchester City	Away	2–1	Gray, Jones	44,590
6 December 1969	Wolverhampton Wanderers	Home	3–1	Holsgrove (o.g.), Charlton, Clarke	33,090
13 December 1969	Sheffield Wednesday	Home	2–0	Clarke (2)	31,114
17 December 1969	West Ham United	Home	4–1	Lorimer (2), Clarke, Giles	30,699
26 December 1969	Newcastle United	Away	1–2	Giles	54,527
27 December 1969	Everton	Home	2–1	Jones (2)	46,770
10 January 1970	Chelsea	Away	5–2	Clarke, Cooper, Giles (pen.), Lorimer, Jones	57,221
17 January 1970	Coventry City	Home	3–1	Clarke (2), Charlton	34,295
26 January 1970	Manchester United	Away	2–2	Jones, Bremner	60,514
31 January 1970	Stoke City	Away	1–1	Giles	35,908
10 February 1970	West Bromwich Albion	Home	5–1	Gray, Jones, Giles (2), Lorimer	31,515
14 February 1970	Tottenham Hotspur	Away	1–1	Lorimer	41,713
28 February 1970	Crystal Palace	Home	2–0	Jones (2)	37,138
7 March 1970	Liverpool	Away	0–0		51,435
21 March 1970	Wolverhampton Wanderers	Away	2–1	Jones, Clarke	35,057
28 March 1970	Southampton	Home	1–3	Lorimer	38,370
30 March 1970	Derby County	Away	1–4	Kennedy	41,011
2 April 1970	West Ham United	Away	2–2	Clarke (2)	26,140
4 April 1970	Burnley	Home	2–1	Gray (2)	24,691
18 April 1970	Manchester City	Home	1–3	Belfitt	22,932
21 April 1970	Ipswich Town	Away	2–3	Hibbitt, Gray	16,875

=== FA Cup ===
Win	Draw	Loss

FA Cup match results
Round	Date	Opponent	Venue	Result F–A	Scorers	Attendance
Third round	3 January 1970	Swansea Town	Home	2–1	Giles, Jones	30,246
Fourth round	24 January 1970	Sutton United	Away	6–0	Clarke (4), Lorimer (2)	14,000
Fifth round	7 February 1970	Mansfield Town	Home	2–0	Giles, Clarke	48,093
Sixth round	21 February 1970	Swindon Town	Away	2–0	Clarke (2)	27,500
Semi-final	14 March 1970	Manchester United	Neutral	0–0		55,000
Semi-final replay	23 March 1970	Manchester United	Neutral	0–0		62,500
Semi-final second replay	26 March 1970	Manchester United	Neutral	1–0	Bremner	56,000
Final	11 April 1970	Chelsea	Neutral	2–2 (a.e.t.)	Charlton, Jones	100,000
Final replay	29 April 1970	Chelsea	Neutral	1–2 (a.e.t.)	Jones	62,078

=== League Cup ===
Win	Draw	Loss

League Cup match details
Round	Date	Opponent	Venue	Result F–A	Scorers	Attendance
Second round	3 September 1969	Fulham	Away	1–0	Charlton	20,446
Third round	24 September 1969	Chelsea	Home	1–1	Madeley	21,933
Third round replay	6 October 1969	Chelsea	Away	0–2		38,485

=== European Cup ===
Win	Draw	Loss

European Cup match details
Round	Date	Opponent	Venue	Result F–A	Scorers	Attendance
First round, first leg	17 September 1969	Lyn	Home	10–0	O'Grady, Jones (3), Clarke (2), Giles (2), Bremner (2)	25,979
First round, second leg	1 October 1969	Lyn	Away	6–0	Hibbitt (2), Belfitt (2), Jones, Lorimer	7,595
Second round, first leg	12 November 1969	Ferencváros	Home	3–0	Giles, Jones (2)	37,291
Second round, second leg	26 November 1969	Ferencváros	Away	3–0	Jones (2), Lorimer	5,400
Third round, first leg	4 March 1970	Standard Liège	Away	1–0	Lorimer	38,000
Third round, second leg	11 March 1970	Standard Liège	Home	1–0	Giles (pen.)	48,775
Semi-final, first leg	1 April 1970	Celtic	Home	0–1		45,505
Semi-final, second leg	15 April 1970	Celtic	Away	1–2	Bremner	136,505

=== FA Charity Shield ===
2 August 1969

Leeds United	2–1	Manchester City
Gray 55'; Charlton 58'	Report	Bell 90'

Elland Road, Leeds
Attendance: 39,835
Referee: K. H. Burns

Leeds United	Manchester City

GK	(Wales) Gary Sprake
RB	(England) Paul Reaney
LB	(England) Terry Cooper
RH	(Scotland) Billy Bremner (c)
CH	(England) Jack Charlton
LH	(England) Norman Hunter
OR	(England) Paul Madeley
IR	(England) Allan Clarke
CF	(England) Mick Jones
IL	(Republic of Ireland) Johnny Giles
OL	(Scotland) Eddie Gray
Substitute
(Scotland) Peter Lorimer
Manager:
(England) Don Revie

GK	(England) Joe Corrigan
RB	(England) Tony Book (c)
LB	(England) Glyn Pardoe
RH	(England) Mike Doyle
CH	(England) Tommy Booth
LH	(England) Alan Oakes
OR	(England) Mike Summerbee
IR	(England) Colin Bell
CF	(England) Francis Lee
IL	(England) Neil Young
OL	(England) Tony Coleman
Manager:
(England) Joe Mercer
