= Paul Madeley =

English footballer (1944–2018)

Personal information
- Full name: Paul Edward Madeley
- Date of birth: 20 September 1944
- Place of birth: Beeston, Leeds, England
- Date of death: 23 July 2018 (aged 73)
- Height: 6 ft 0 in (1.83 m)
- Positions: Defender; midfielder

Youth career
- Farsley Celtic
- 1962–1963: Leeds United

Senior career*
Years	Team	Apps	(Gls)
1963–1980	Leeds United	536	(25)

International career
1971–1977	England	24	(0)
- * Club domestic league appearances and goals

Paul Edward Madeley (20 September 1944 – 23 July 2018) was an English footballer, who played for Leeds United and the England national team. During his career with Leeds, Madeley played in a variety of different playing positions which led to him being described as a utility player. Madeley made more than 500 appearances for Leeds in the Football League and appeared in 24 internationals for England between 1971 and 1977.

== Leeds United ==
Born in the Beeston area of Leeds, West Riding of Yorkshire Madeley signed for Leeds from non-league Farsley Celtic in May 1962 and made his debut for Leeds in January 1964, following injuries to Freddie Goodwin and Jack Charlton, and became a regular in the team from 1966 onwards.

Madeley was arguably the most versatile of players – in his Leeds United career, he played in every position on the pitch except goalkeeper and wore every shirt from No. 2 to No. 11 (and occasionally No. 12) as a result. His natural ability to adapt to a different role on a frequent basis meant that he was often in the side chosen by manager Don Revie at the expense of a 'specialist' in that position, though the majority of the time there was a player either injured or suspended whom Madeley would replace – usually in defence.

However, Madeley was utilised in attacking positions when Leeds won their first major honours under Don Revie; in the 1968 Football League Cup Final, Madeley wore the No. 9 shirt (striker) in the 1–0 win over Arsenal, whilst in 1971 he scored the crucial away goal against Juventus which helped Leeds win the Fairs Cup – in the two legs he wore the No. 11 shirt (left wing/midfield). His versatility led to the nickname "The Eleven Pauls", which was used in the 1972 FA Cup Final song Leeds United.

Having deputised so well for Paul Reaney at club level, Madeley was asked by Alf Ramsey to take Reaney's place in the England squad for that summer's World Cup in Mexico, but Madeley politely refused, saying he wanted to rest and, as a stand-in, was unlikely to kick a ball.

In the 1971–72 season, Madeley again found himself moving round the side as injuries and suspensions to his teammates, and in the end he never missed a League match, though for a third year in a row Leeds failed to clinch the title on the last day of the season. In April 1972, left back Terry Cooper suffered a broken leg, so Madeley switched to the No. 3 shirt for the season's end and the FA Cup final, which Leeds finally won with a 1–0 win over Arsenal.

Revie signed Trevor Cherry as a replacement for Cooper in the summer of 1972, and Madeley moved across to the centre of defence for much of the next season as Jack Charlton's distinguished career at Leeds wound down. He wore the No. 5 shirt as Leeds lost the FA Cup final to Sunderland, and the European Cup Winners Cup final a few days later in Salonika, which Leeds lost to A.C. Milan in controversial circumstances.

Leeds won the League in 1974 – Madeley missing just three matches – and even after Revie's departure that summer to take over the England job, reached their first and only European Cup final a year later, with Madeley in the No. 5 shirt again.

In his autobiography, Right Back to the Beginning, Revie's successor Jimmy Armfield related a telling story about Madeley negotiating a new contract: "He once actually signed a new contract on what was virtually a blank piece of paper. I called him in to discuss terms and opened discussions by saying, 'OK, Paul, we'll give you so much'. He replied that he had no intention of leaving Leeds so he might as well sign the contract and let me fill in the details. I said, 'What do you want, then, two years or three years?' He answered, 'Either way, I'll leave it to you. I just want to play for Leeds,' and that was that."

Madeley was granted a testimonial season in 1977, and eventually retired from playing in 1980 with 724 appearances in all competitions to his name.

== International career ==
Madeley made his England debut in 1971 against Northern Ireland in Belfast in the 1970–71 British Home Championship at right-back; a position he was to win the majority of his 24 caps in a six-year international career. The then England manager Alf Ramsey had previously approached Madeley to replace injured Leeds teammate Paul Reaney at the 1970 World Cup in Mexico, but Madeley politely declined, stating that he needed a rest and that as a stand-in he was unlikely to play a part. Madeley later partnered Bobby Moore at centre-back as the latter won his 100th cap against Scotland in 1973. His final cap came against the Netherlands in a friendly at Wembley in 1977.

== Post-playing career ==
After retiring Madeley invested in a shop in Leeds selling sports goods and worked for his family's DIY business. He and his brothers sold this business for £27 million in 1987. In 1992, he had a benign brain tumour removed. He had a mild heart attack in 2002, and was diagnosed with Parkinson's disease in 2004. Madeley was portrayed by actor Chris Moore in the 2009 film The Damned United, an adaptation of David Peace's novel of the same name about Brian Clough's ill-fated tenure at Leeds.

Madeley died on 23 July 2018, aged 73.

== Career statistics ==
=== Club ===
Appearances and goals by club, season and competition
Club	Season	League			FA Cup		League Cup		Europe		Other		Total	
Club	Season	Division	Apps	Goals	Apps	Goals	Apps	Goals	Apps	Goals	Apps	Goals	Apps	Goals
Leeds United	1963–64	Second Division	4	0	2	0	0	0	—		—		6	0
Leeds United	1964–65	First Division	6	0	0	0	1	0	—		—		7	0
Leeds United	1965–66	First Division	13	1	1	0	2	1	4 (Note: Appearance(s) in Inter-Cities Fairs Cup)	0	—		20	2
Leeds United	1966–67	First Division	28	2	5	1	4	0	8	1	—		45	4
Leeds United	1967–68	First Division	36	7	5	1	5	0	11	2	—		57	10
Leeds United	1968–69	First Division	31	3	2	0	2	1	7	0	—		42	4
Leeds United	1969–70	First Division	39	0	8	0	3	1	8 (Note: Appearance(s) in European Cup)	0	1 (Note: Appearance(s) in FA Charity Shield)	0	59	1
Leeds United	1970–71	First Division	41	5	4	0	1	0	12	1	—		58	6
Leeds United	1971–72	First Division	42	2	7	0	4	0	1 (Note: Appearance(s) in UEFA Cup)	0	—		54	2
Leeds United	1972–73	First Division	34	0	8	0	4	0	6 (Note: Appearance(s) in UEFA Cup Winners' Cup)	0	—		52	0
Leeds United	1973–74	First Division	39	2	5	0	1	0	2	0	—		47	2
Leeds United	1974–75	First Division	38	1	8	0	5	0	9	0	0	0	60	1
Leeds United	1975–76	First Division	39	1	2	0	2	0	—		—		43	1
Leeds United	1976–77	First Division	38	0	5	0	1	0	—		—		44	0
Leeds United	1977–78	First Division	38	0	1	0	6	0	—		—		45	0
Leeds United	1978–79	First Division	39	1	3	0	7	0	—		—		49	1
Leeds United	1979–80	First Division	25	0	1	0	0	0	3	0	—		29	0
Leeds United	1980–81	First Division	6	0	0	0	2	0	—		—		8	0
Career total			536	25	67	2	50	3	71	4	1	0	725	34

=== International ===
Appearances and goals by national team and year
National team	Year	Apps	Goals
England	1971	4	0
England	1972	4	0
England	1973	8	0
England	1974	2	0
England	1975	3	0
England	1976	2	0
England	1977	1	0
Total		24	0

== Honours ==
Leeds United

- Football League First Division: 1968–69, 1973–74
- Football League Second Division: 1963–64
- FA Cup: 1971–72; runner-up: 1969–70, 1972–73
- Football League Cup: 1967–68
- FA Charity Shield: 1969
- Inter-Cities Fairs Cup: 1967–68, 1970–71

Individual

- Rothmans Golden Boots Awards: 1972, 1973, 1974
- PFA Team of the Year: 1973–74 First Division, 1974–75 First Division, 1975–76 First Division
- Leeds United Player of the Year: 1975–76
