= 1968–69 Leeds United A.F.C. season =

1968–69 season of Leeds United

Leeds United
1968–69 season
- Chairman: Percy Woodward
- Manager: Don Revie
- Stadium: Elland Road
- First Division: 1st
- FA Cup: Third round
- Football League Cup: Fourth round
- Inter-Cities Fairs Cup: Fourth round
- Top goalscorer: League: Mick Jones (14); All: Mick Jones (17)
- Highest home attendance: 48,145
- Lowest home attendance: 16,359
- Average home league attendance: 34,424
- Biggest win: 6–1 vs. Burnley, 21 December 1968
- Biggest defeat: 1–5 vs. Burnley, 19 October 1968

The 1968–69 season was Leeds United's fifth consecutive season in the First Division. Along with the First Division, they competed in the FA Cup, Football League Cup and the Inter-Cities Fairs Cup. The season covers the period from 1 July 1968 to 30 June 1969.

== Background ==
Following the resignation of Jack Taylor, Don Revie was appointed as player-manager.

Revie implemented a change of kit colour to an all-white strip in the style of Real Madrid, and concentrating the club policy on scouting and developing youth talent, rather than just trying to buy players. He appointed experienced coaches like Les Cocker, Maurice Lindley and Syd Owen, and implemented radical techniques like forming a family atmosphere around the club. Revie took on more revolutionary techniques, his pre-match preparation was meticulous for its day, his staff prepared highly detailed dossiers on the opposition before every match and pioneered a highly detailed approach to the way opposing teams could be analysed. Coaches like Les Cocker were also responsible for developing high fitness levels in the Leeds players, using diets and rigorous, military style training programs. Revie forged a completely new team around a crop of outstanding youth talents, including Norman Hunter, Paul Reaney, Peter Lorimer, Eddie Gray, Billy Bremner, Paul Madeley, Albert Johanneson and these were backed up by more experienced heads Jack Charlton, and veteran Scottish international central midfielder Bobby Collins. Revie also made a shrewd purchase in acquiring former Busby Babe winger John Giles from Manchester United, who Leeds' coaching staff would mould into one of the most influential central midfielders of the game. In 1964 this new team won promotion once more to the First Division.

Leeds made an immediate impact; they began the season with a scintillating 4–2 victory over defending league champions Liverpool, which would set the tone for the rest of the season. Revie's young side chased an improbable league and cup double finishing the 1964–65 season as runners up only to Busby's Manchester United, losing the title on goal average. They turned the tables on Manchester United in the FA cup semi-final replay, reaching the FA Cup Final where they were beaten 2–1 by Liverpool in a dour game, best remembered for the appearance of Albert Johanneson, the first black player to play in an FA Cup final.

The 1965–66 season saw Leeds consolidate their place in the First Division, finishing as runners up in the league again, and progressing through to the semi-finals of the Inter-Cities Fairs Cup with victories over sides such as Valencia and Torino.

The 1966–67 season saw Leeds finish 4th in the league, as well as reaching the FA Cup Semi-finals and making an early exit from the League Cup. In addition, their European campaign ended as beaten finalists in the Inter-Cities Fairs Cup, losing 2–0 to Dinamo Zagreb.

Leeds spent the 1967–68 season chasing four trophies; leading the title race for much of the season, although eventually losing out to Manchester City and finishing fourth. Revie's men were also beaten semi-finalists in the FA Cup, although they did find their first domestic and European successes, completing a League Cup and Fairs Cup double. Terry Cooper's goal securing a tense League Cup final victory against Arsenal, and a Mick Jones goal secured the Fairs cup victory over the veteran Hungarian side Ferencváros. Leeds were the first British team to win the trophy.

== Season summary ==
Having found success in both domestic and European cup competitions, manager Revie chose to focus on the league for the 1968–69 campaign. Leeds secured the title in April 1969 with a 0–0 draw with challengers Liverpool at Anfield, whose supporters congratulated the Leeds team. Leeds set a number of records including most points (67), most wins (27), fewest defeats (2) and most home points (39); a still-unbroken club record is their 34 match unbeaten run that extended into the following season. Leeds strengthened their front line, breaking the British transfer record by signing Allan Clarke from Leicester City for £165,000. They targeted the treble in 1969–70 and came close to achieving this, only to fail on all three fronts in a congested close season, finishing second in the league to Everton, losing the 1970 FA Cup Final to Chelsea (after a replay), and exiting the European Cup with a semi-final defeat to Celtic.

== Competitions ==
=== Football League First Division ===
==== League table ====
Pos	Team	Pld	W	D	L	GF	GA	GAv	Pts	Qualification or relegation
1	Leeds United (C)	42	27	13	2	66	26	2.538	67	Qualification for the European Cup first round
2	Liverpool	42	25	11	6	63	24	2.625	61	Qualification for the Inter-Cities Fairs Cup first round
3	Everton	42	21	15	6	77	36	2.139	57	
4	Arsenal	42	22	12	8	56	27	2.074	56	Qualification for the Inter-Cities Fairs Cup first round (Note: Everton were ineligible to participate in the Inter-Cities Fairs Cup as Liverpool had already qualified. Under the rules of the cup, only one team per city could participate. Arsenal took their place as the highest-ranked team that hadn't already qualified for a European competition.)
5	Chelsea	42	20	10	12	73	53	1.377	50	

Source: World Football
Rules for classification: 1) Points; 2) Goal average; 3) Goals scored
(C) Champions

==== Matches ====
Win	Draw	Loss

First Division match results
Date	Opponent	Venue	Result F–A	Scorers	Attendance
10 August 1968	Southampton	Away	3–1	Lorimer, Jones, Hibbitt	25,479
14 August 1968	Queens Park Rangers	Home	4–1	Jones, Giles, Reaney, Hibbitt	31,612
17 August 1968	Stoke City	Home	2–0	Jones, Johanneson	30,383
20 August 1968	Ipswich Town	Away	3–2	O'Grady, Belfitt, Hibbitt	30,382
28 August 1968	Sunderland	Home	1–1	Belfitt	37,797
31 August 1968	Liverpool	Home	1–0	Jones	38,929
7 September 1968	Wolverhampton Wanderers	Home	2–1	Cooper, Charlton	31,227
14 September 1968	Leicester City	Away	1–1	Madeley	28,564
21 September 1968	Arsenal	Home	2–0	Charlton, O'Grady	39,946
28 September 1968	Manchester City	Away	1–3	O'Grady	45,000
5 October 1968	Newcastle United	Away	1–0	Charlton	41,915
9 October 1968	Sunderland	Away	1–0	Jones	33,853
12 October 1968	West Ham United	Home	2–0	Giles (pen.), Lorimer	40,786
19 October 1968	Burnley	Away	1–5	Bremner	26,423
26 October 1968	West Bromwich Albion	Home	0–0	—	33,926
2 November 1968	Manchester United	Away	0–0	—	53,839
9 November 1968	Tottenham Hotspur	Home	0–0	—	38,995
16 November 1968	Coventry City	Away	1–0	Madeley	33,224
23 November 1968	Everton	Home	2–1	Giles (pen.), Gray	41,716
30 November 1968	Chelsea	Away	1–1	O'Grady	43,286
7 December 1968	Sheffield Wednesday	Home	2–0	Lorimer (2)	32,718
14 December 1968	West Ham United	Away	1–1	Gray	27,418
21 December 1968	Burnley	Home	6–1	Lorimer (2), Bremner, Jones, Giles, Gray	31,409
26 December 1968	Newcastle United	Home	2–1	Lorimer (pen.), Madeley	42,000
11 January 1969	Manchester United	Home	2–1	Jones, O'Grady	48,145
18 January 1969	Tottenham Hotspur	Away	0–0	—	42,396
24 January 1969	Queens Park Rangers	Away	1–0	Jones	26,163
1 February 1969	Coventry City	Home	3–0	O'Grady, Bremner (2)	32,314
12 February 1969	Ipswich Town	Home	2–0	Belfitt, Jones	24,229
15 February 1969	Chelsea	Home	1–0	Lorimer	35,789
25 February 1969	Nottingham Forest	Away	2–0	Lorimer, Jones	36,249
1 March 1969	Southampton	Home	3–2	Giles (pen.), Jones, Kirkup (o.g.)	33,205
8 March 1969	Stoke City	Away	5–1	Jones, Bremner (2), O'Grady (2)	24,327
29 March 1969	Wolverhampton Wanderers	Away	0–0	—	27,986
1 April 1969	Sheffield Wednesday	Away	0–0	—	34,278
5 April 1969	Manchester City	Home	1–0	Giles	43,176
9 April 1969	West Bromwich Albion	Away	1–1	Gray	28,959
12 April 1969	Arsenal	Away	2–1	Jones, Giles	43,715
19 April 1969	Leicester City	Home	2–0	Jones, Gray	38,391
22 April 1969	Everton	Away	0–0	—	59,000
28 April 1969	Liverpool	Away	0–0	—	53,750
30 April 1969	Nottingham Forest	Home	1–0	Giles	46,508

=== FA Cup ===
Win	Draw	Loss

FA Cup match results
Round	Date	Opponent	Venue	Result F–A	Scorers	Attendance
Third round	4 January 1969	Sheffield Wednesday	Away	1–1	Lorimer (pen.)	52,111
Third round replay	8 January 1969	Sheffield Wednesday	Home	1–3	Johanneson	48,234

=== Football League Cup ===
Win	Draw	Loss

Football League Cup match results
Round	Date	Opponent	Venue	Result F–A	Scorers	Attendance
Second round	4 September 1968	Charlton Athletic	Home	1–0	Jones	18,860
Third round	25 September 1968	Bristol City	Home	2–1	Johanneson, Jones	16,359
Fourth round	16 October 1968	Crystal Palace	Away	1–2	Madeley	26,217

=== Inter-Cities Fairs Cup ===
Win	Draw	Loss

Inter-Cities Fairs Cup match results
Round	Date	Opponent	Venue	Result F–A	Scorers	Attendance
First round 1st leg	18 September 1968	Standard Liège	Away	0–0	—	35,000
First round 2nd leg	23 October 1968	Standard Liège	Home	3–2	Charlton, Lorimer, Bremner	24,178
Second round 1st leg	13 November 1968	Napoli	Home	2–0	Charlton (2)	26,967
Second round 2nd leg	27 November 1968	Napoli	Away	0–2 (Note: Leeds win on coin toss)	—	15,000
Third round 1st leg	18 December 1968	Hannover 96	Home	5–1	O'Grady, Hunter, Lorimer (2), Charlton	25,162
Third round 2nd leg	4 February 1969	Hannover 96	Away	2–1	Belfitt, Jones	15,000
Fourth round 1st leg	5 March 1969	Ujpest Dosza	Home	0–1	—	30,906
Fourth round 2nd leg	19 March 1969	Ujpest Dosza	Away	0–2	—	40,000
