= Peter Lorimer =

Scottish footballer (1946–2021)

Personal information
- Full name: Peter Patrick Lorimer
- Date of birth: 14 December 1946
- Place of birth: Dundee, Scotland
- Date of death: 20 March 2021 (aged 74)
- Height: 5 ft 9 1/2 in (1.77 m)
- Position: Attacking midfielder

Senior career*
Years	Team	Apps	(Gls)
1962–1978	Leeds United	450	(151)
1971	→ Cape Town City (loan)	6	(8)
1979	Toronto Blizzard	29	(9)
1979–1980	York City	29	(8)
1980	Toronto Blizzard	18	(2)
1981–1983	Vancouver Whitecaps	80	(22)
1983	→ UCD (loan)	3	(0)
1983–1985	Leeds United	76	(17)
1985–1986	Whitby Town		
1986	Hapoel Haifa		
Total		691	(217)

International career
1963	Scotland Amateur	7	(7)
1969–1976	Scotland	21	(4)
- * Club domestic league appearances and goals

Peter Patrick Lorimer (14 December 1946 – 20 March 2021) was a Scottish professional footballer who mainly played for Leeds United and Scotland during the late 1960s and early 1970s. An attacking midfielder and the club's youngest-ever player, he was renowned for his very powerful shots from distance. From 1984 to 1985 he was club captain. Lorimer is the club record scorer with 238 goals in all competitions. He was voted Leeds' ninth greatest player ever and on to the greatest Leeds United team of all time.

Overall, he made over 1,000 appearances in his career.

After retiring as a player, Lorimer became a member of the Leeds board of directors, provided match commentary on BBC Radio Leeds and Yorkshire Radio and wrote a regular column in the Yorkshire Evening Post. From April 2013 he held the position of club ambassador.

== Early life ==
Lorimer was born in Dundee to Janet and Peter Lorimer and was brought up in Broughty Ferry on the edge of the city. He attended Eastern Primary School and later Stobswell Secondary School, where he played for the school's football team.

== Club career ==
=== Leeds United ===
After playing junior football in Dundee for Stobswell Boys and Broughty YMCA, Lorimer signed for Leeds United in May 1962 after scoring for the Scotland Schoolboys team in a 4–2 win over England. He made his Leeds debut on 29 September 1962 against Southampton, aged 15 years and 289 days, becoming the youngest player to play for the first team.

Lorimer came to regular prominence in the 1965–66 season, making 34 League Championship appearances and scoring 19 goals, more than any other player at Leeds United managed that season. A skilful and industrious player who operated best in a drifting position either wide on the right (though not as an orthodox winger – he was more likely to cut in and shoot than stay wide and cross) or behind two main strikers (usually Allan Clarke and Mick Jones), Lorimer was a frequent and often spectacular goalscorer, earning himself several nicknames stemming from his powerful shooting – HotShot and Lash being two of the more prevalent. He became renowned for these strikes, with his shots reaching speeds of up to 90 mph. One penalty kick was recorded at 107 mph.

In the 1966–67 season, Lorimer made his first major headlines when a free-kick equaliser against Chelsea in an FA Cup semi-final was controversially ruled out by referee Ken Burns and retaken, for the Chelsea players had not retreated the necessary 10 yards. Chelsea held on to win the game. In the 1975 European Cup Final, Lorimer scored to give Leeds a 1–0 lead, only for the goal to be controversially disallowed by referee Michel Kitabdjian, with Leeds going on to lose the game. In summer 1971, Lorimer had a short spell on loan at Cape Town City in South Africa. Lorimer left the club in 1979, having scored 219 goals in 616 appearances. During this time he had won two League titles, an FA Cup, a League Cup, a Charity Shield, and two Inter-Cities Fairs Cups.

=== Later career ===
He played for York City and then tried his luck in the North American Soccer League (NASL). Lorimer played for two clubs: the Toronto Blizzard (1979–1980) and the Vancouver Whitecaps (1981–83). In January 1983 he signed for University College Dublin, where he would play in three League of Ireland matches and an FAI Cup tie within two months.

Lorimer returned to Leeds United in 1983, aged 37, two seasons after Leeds had fallen into the Football League Second Division. He played under former team-mate Eddie Gray (more than a year his junior) and broke the club's goalscoring record in the process, ending up with 238 goals from 705 appearances until retiring just before his 40th birthday at the end of the 1985–86 season. However, Leeds were still a Second Division team when Lorimer played his final game for them and it would be another four years before they returned to the First Division.

== International career ==
Lorimer made his international debut for Scotland against Austria in November 1969. He won 21 caps for Scotland and scored four goals, having played in all three of their matches at the 1974 FIFA World Cup. His Scotland career was, however, affected by a ban imposed on him in 1971 after he spent a summer playing for Cape Town City in apartheid-era South Africa.

== After playing ==
In his retirement Lorimer ran the Commercial Inn pub in the Holbeck area of the city. Lorimer remained a dedicated spokesman for Leeds United after retirement – he was always one of the first ex-players to whom broadcasters and journalists turned when the club was in the news. He worked as a pundit at games for BBC Radio Leeds and as a columnist for the local paper, the Yorkshire Evening Post. He wrote a column in the club's match programme (his final one being the match against Aston Villa on 27 February 2021) and acted as a summariser for Yorkshire Radio on every Leeds away match.

On 26 February 2021, it was announced that Lorimer had been placed under hospice care due to a long-term illness. He died on 20 March 2021, aged 74.

== Career statistics ==
=== Club ===
Appearances and goals by club, season and competition
Club	Season	League			FA Cup		League Cup		Continental (Note: Includes matches in Inter-Cities Fairs Cup, European Cup, European Cup Winners' Cup, and UEFA Cup competitions.)		Other (Note: Includes matches in FA Charity Shield and Full Members' Cup competitions.)		Total	
Club	Season	Division	Apps	Goals	Apps	Goals	Apps	Goals	Apps	Goals	Apps	Goals	Apps	Goals
Leeds United	1962–63	Second Division	1	0	0	0	0	0	—		—		1	0
Leeds United	1963–64	Second Division	0	0	0	0	1	0	—		—		0	0
Leeds United	1964–65	First Division	1	0	0	0	0	0	—		—		1	0
Leeds United	1965–66	First Division	34	13	2	3	0	0	9	3	—		45	19
Leeds United	1966–67	First Division	29	9	6	2	2	2	5	1	—		42	14
Leeds United	1967–68	First Division	37	16	5	2	6	4	12	8	—		60	30
Leeds United	1968–69	First Division	29	9	2	1	3	0	7	3	—		41	13
Leeds United	1969–70	First Division	39	14	8	2	3	0	7	3	1	0	58	19
Leeds United	1970–71	First Division	38	12	4	2	1	0	10	5	—		53	19
Leeds United	1971–72	First Division	42	23	7	3	4	2	2	1	—		55	29
Leeds United	1972–73	First Division	41	15	8	3	5	3	9	2	—		63	23
Leeds United	1973–74	First Division	37	12	5	2	0	0	5	0	—		47	14
Leeds United	1974–75	First Division	36	9	4	0	5	3	8	4	1	0	53	16
Leeds United	1975–76	First Division	29	10	2	0	2	1	—		—		33	11
Leeds United	1976–77	First Division	26	3	2	0	0	0	—		—		28	3
Leeds United	1977–78	First Division	28	6	0	0	4	3	—		—		32	9
Leeds United	1978–79	First Division	3	0	0	0	1	0	—		—		4	0
Leeds United	Total		450	151	55	20	37	18	74	30	2	0	618	219
Cape Town City (loan)	1971	National Football League	6	8					—		—		6	8
Toronto Blizzard	1979	North American Soccer League	29	9					—		—		29	9
York City	1979–80	Fourth Division	29	8					—		—		29	8
Toronto Blizzard	1980	North American Soccer League	18	2					—		—		18	2
Vancouver Whitecaps	1981	North American Soccer League	27	8					—		—		27	8
Vancouver Whitecaps	1982	North American Soccer League	28	10					—		—		28	10
Vancouver Whitecaps	1983	North American Soccer League	25	4					—		—		25	4
Vancouver Whitecaps	Total		80	22									80	22
University College Dublin (loan)	1982–83	League of Ireland	3	0					—		—		3	0
Leeds United	1983–84	Second Division	22	4	3	0	0	0	—		—		25	4
Leeds United	1984–85	Second Division	40	9	1	0	3	1	—		—		44	10
Leeds United	1985–86	Second Division	14	4	0	0	2	0	—		2	1	18	5
Leeds United	Total		76	17	4	0	5	1	0	0	2	1	80	22
Career total			691	217	59	20	42	19	74	30	4	1	870	287

=== International ===
Appearances and goals by national team and year
National team	Year	Apps	Goals
Scotland	1969	1	0
Scotland	1970	0	0
Scotland	1971	2	0
Scotland	1972	5	3
Scotland	1973	3	0
Scotland	1974	7	1
Scotland	1975	3	0
Total		21	4

Scores and results list Scotland goal tally first, score column indicates score after each Scotland goal.

List of international goals scored by Peter Lorimer
No.	Date	Venue	Opponent	Score	Result	Competition
1	20 May 1972	Hampden Park, Glasgow, Scotland	Northern Ireland	2–0	2–0	1971–72 British Home Championship
2	24 May 1972	Hampden Park, Glasgow, Scotland	Wales	1–0	1–0	1971–72 British Home Championship
3	15 November 1972	Hampden Park, Glasgow, Scotland	Denmark	2–0	2–0	1974 FIFA World Cup qualification
4	14 June 1974	Westfalenstadion, Dortmund, Germany	Zaire	1–0	2–0	1974 FIFA World Cup

== Honours ==
Leeds United

- Football League First Division: 1968–69, 1973–74
- FA Cup: 1971–72; runner-up: 1969–70, 1972–73
- Football League Cup: 1967–68
- FA Charity Shield: 1969
- Inter-Cities Fairs Cup: 1967–68, 1970–71; runner-up: 1966–67
- European Cup runner-up: 1974–75
- European Cup Winners' Cup runner-up: 1972–73

Individual

- Leeds United Player of the Year: 1971–72
- Rothmans Golden Boots Awards: 1973
