= Tugman =

Tugman is a surname. Notable people with the surname include:

- Blair Tugman, American mixed martial artist
- Jimmy Tugman (born 1945), British footballer
- Pat A. Tugman, American politician
- William M. Tugman (1894–1961), American journalist

== See also ==
- Šugman
