= Šugman =

Šugman is a surname. Notable people with the surname include:

- Jernej Šugman (1968–2017), Slovene actor
- Zlatko Šugman (1932–2008), Slovene actor

== See also ==
- Tugman
