= Gary Sprake =

Welsh footballer (1945–2016)

Personal information
- Full name: Gareth Sprake
- Date of birth: 3 April 1945
- Place of birth: Swansea, Wales
- Date of death: 18 October 2016 (aged 71)
- Place of death: Solihull, England
- Height: 6 ft 0 in (1.83 m)
- Position: Goalkeeper

Youth career
- 1962–1963: Leeds United

Senior career*
Years	Team	Apps	(Gls)
1962–1973	Leeds United	381	(0)
1973–1975	Birmingham City	16	(0)
Total		397	(0)

International career
1963–1974	Wales	37	(0)
- * Club domestic league appearances and goals

Gareth Sprake (3 April 1945 – 18 October 2016) was a Welsh professional footballer. A goalkeeper, he played for Leeds United and Birmingham City and also won 37 caps for Wales.

Sprake was a good goalkeeper who made occasional high-profile mistakes. He was especially known for his ability to come out to catch crossed balls floating into the box and his shot stopping. At Leeds, Sprake played 504 times, keeping more than 200 clean sheets. He spent more than a decade at Leeds, much of it as number-one choice, during a period when the club was a dominant side in domestic and European football.

== Club career ==
Sprake represented Swansea Schoolboys and was noticed by Leeds United soon after he left school and was playing for a local works team.

Sprake joined Leeds as an apprentice and made a last-minute debut in 1962 when the regular goalkeeper went down with a stomach complaint on the day of a game at Southampton. Over the next two seasons Sprake became a regular as Leeds won the Second Division in 1964 and then challenged for the Football League championship title and FA Cup double the following year. Sprake only missed one game in both competitions that season, but Leeds ended with nothing. At Leeds, he was also known to be sick before each match but managed to play regularly and keep the starting goalkeeper position.

The first of Sprake's two major errors came in 1967 when Leeds played Liverpool in a League game at Anfield. Sprake was holding the ball and was set to throw it to left back Terry Cooper, only to curtail his throw when he spotted Liverpool winger Ian Callaghan running towards the area he planned to throw the ball. Unfortunately for Sprake, the ball slipped out of his hands behind him and ended up in the net. At half-time, the Liverpool tannoy-announcer played "Careless Hands", a record by Des O'Connor, apparently in reference to Sprake's mistake, and during the second half Liverpool supporters on the Kop sang the song repeatedly to Sprake. Fans of rival clubs gave Sprake the nickname "Careless Hands" as a result.

In the same season Sprake kept a clean sheet as Leeds beat Arsenal in the League Cup final. He was also in goals when Leeds won the Fairs Cup, the club's first European honour. In 1969, Sprake was again a regular as Leeds won the League championship for the first time, with a new points record.

In the 1970 FA Cup Final, Leeds were playing Chelsea and took an early lead through Jack Charlton. Chelsea chased an equaliser, but when attacking midfield player Peter Houseman hit a left foot shot shortly before the break, it seemed tame and directionless enough for Sprake to save it safely. He dived full length to save it but it squirmed through his grasp and rolled into the net. At the time, the Wembley surface was in poor condition, with the stadium having hosted the Horse of the Year Show days earlier and having much of the grass turned into hard turf lumps as a result, as well as the presence of a vast covering of sand.

In the second half, Mick Jones put Leeds ahead with just six minutes to go, but Chelsea again equalised. Sprake suffered a knee injury and was replaced by David Harvey in the replay, which Chelsea won 2–1.

Sprake was still the first-choice keeper for Leeds in the following two seasons, but was replaced by Harvey at the tail of both, including the 1972 FA Cup Final. Sprake watched from the sidelines as Leeds defeated Arsenal 1–0. In the same year, due to his need of first-team football, Sprake publicly criticised Revie for his treatment of him and so his relationship with his manager, teammates and the Leeds supporters soured. He only played once in the 1972–73 season, missed a second FA Cup Final and the Cup Winners' Cup final and left Leeds at the end of that season. He signed for Birmingham City for £100,000 (breaking the world record transfer fee for a goalkeeper in the process) to play first-team football and attempt to regain his place in the Welsh team.

== International career ==
Sprake was the youngest-ever goalkeeper to appear for Wales when he made his international debut as an 18-year-old against Scotland on 20 November 1963.

Sprake won 37 caps for Wales between 1963 and 1974.

== Retirement ==
A back injury brought Sprake's career to an end at the age of 30, the injury resulting from a near fatal blood clot in his back which forced him to undergo spinal fusion surgery. His back problems were largely blamed on regular injections of cortisone he was given during his early career at Leeds. After retiring, he underwent seven operations on his back. Sprake worked as a salesman for a short period before becoming a borough council training officer in Solihull, where he remained for over 14 years. His biography, Careless Hands: The Forgotten Truth of Gary Sprake by Tim Johnson and Stuart Sprake (his nephew), was published in 2006. In November 2009, he was given an award by the Football Association of Wales for his contribution to Welsh football during the 1960s and 1970s.

In 1978, Sprake was paid a substantial fee by the Daily Mirror to make allegations against former Leeds manager Don Revie and club captain Billy Bremner regarding match-fixing, though no charges ever arose from his accusations. Allegations centred on the match between Wolverhampton Wanderers and Leeds at Molineux on 8 May 1972. It was the final match of the 1971–72 season and Leeds needed one point to win the league title. They lost 2–1 and the title went to Derby County. The paper alleged that Revie and Bremner had tried to bribe Danny Hegan, a Wolves player, before the match. In 1982, Bremner sued for libel in the High Court and was awarded damages of £100,000. Among witnesses who supported Bremner was Wolves' Derek Dougan, who asserted that he "never heard any Leeds player, or anyone else connected with them, offer bribes". Sprake, who said in court that he "couldn't remember" Bremner offering a bribe, later claimed that the Mirror paid him £7,500.

Paul Harrison, one of Bremner's biographers writing in 2010, remembered Sprake as a rude and arrogant individual whose attitude was in sharp contrast to the friendliness and approachability of Revie, Bremner, and many other Leeds players. Harrison quoted Bremner saying of Sprake that he should have "tried harder" and "concentrated more" on improving his game because, "instead of believing he was the best, he would then have made a decent keeper". Bremner made it clear that he had little respect for Sprake because of "things he has done in his life", and pointed out that, among professional footballers, Sprake was "not one of the wisest or most respected". Bremner acknowledged that Sprake was capable of pulling off some "unbelievable" saves, before adding that this was "as positive as I can get about the man". Bremner went on to say what he thought about twelve other Leeds players and, in every case, his comments were very positive. Comparing Sprake with David Harvey, Bremner said Harvey was the better goalkeeper because he was reliable.

Sprake died at the age of 71 on 18 October 2016.

== Honours ==
Leeds United

- Football League First Division: 1968–69
- Football League Second Division: 1963–64
- Football League Cup: 1967–68
- FA Charity Shield: 1969
- Inter-Cities Fairs Cup: 1967–68, 1970–71
- FA Cup runner-up: 1964–65
