= Børge Bach =

Danish footballer (1945-2016)

Personal information
- Date of birth: 20 January 1945
- Date of death: 7 June 2016 (aged 71)
- Position: Midfielder

Senior career*
Years	Team	Apps	(Gls)
1963–1977	AaB		

International career
1973	Denmark	1	(0)
- * Club domestic league appearances and goals

Børge Bach (20 January 1945 – 7 June 2016) was a Danish footballer who played for AaB and the national team, as a midfielder.
