= Pat A. Tugman =

Wyoming politician

Member of the Wyoming House of Representatives from the Laramie district
- In office 1978–1978

Pat A. Tugman is an American Republican politician from Cheyenne, Wyoming. She represented the Laramie district in the Wyoming House of Representatives in 1978.
