= David Kydd =

English footballer (born 1945)

Personal information
- Full name: David Richard Kydd
- Date of birth: 22 December 1945 (age 80)
- Place of birth: Penge, England
- Positions: Wing half; striker

Youth career
- Brighton & Hove Albion

Senior career*
Years	Team	Apps	(Gls)
1963–1966	Brighton & Hove Albion	2	(0)
1966	Chelmsford City		
1966–1968	Margate		
1968	Dartford	19	(3)
- * Club domestic league appearances and goals

David Richard Kydd (born 22 December 1945) is an English former footballer who played as a wing half.

== Career ==
Kydd began his career in the youth ranks at Brighton & Hove Albion, making his debut for the first team in a Sussex Senior Cup game. On 21 September 1965, Kydd made his debut for Brighton in a 2–1 loss against Ipswich Town in the League Cup, before making his Football League debut against Millwall in a 2–2 home draw four days later. In the summer of 1966, Kydd signed for Chelmsford City. In October 1966, following a recommendation from former Chelmsford player Peter Gillott, Kydd joined Margate. On 29 October 1966, Kydd scored twice on his debut in a 4–0 win against Dunstable Town. In his fourth game for the club, Kydd scored a hat-trick in an 8–0 win against Tunbridge Wells on 12 November 1966. In February 1968, Kydd signed for Dartford.
