= Graham Bent =

Welsh footballer

Personal information
- Full name: Graham William Bent
- Date of birth: 6 October 1945
- Place of birth: Ruabon, Wrexham, Wales
- Date of death: 15 May 2002 (aged 56)
- Place of death: Nuneaton, Warwickshire, England
- Position: Winger

Youth career
- Aston Villa

Senior career*
Years	Team	Apps	(Gls)
1963–1965	Wrexham	10	(2)
- Dudley Town
- * Club domestic league appearances and goals

Graham William Bent (6 October 1945 – 15 May 2002) was a Welsh professional footballer, who played as a winger. He came up through the youth team at Aston Villa, but didn't make an appearance at the club, however he did make appearances in the English Football League for Wrexham. Played for Wales Vs England
