= Les Barratt =

English footballer

Personal information
- Full name: Leslie Edwin Barratt
- Date of birth: 13 August 1945 (age 81)
- Place of birth: Nuneaton, England
- Position: Inside forward

Senior career*
Years	Team	Apps	(Gls)
1961–1962	Windermere		
1962–1964	Barrow	10	(0)
1964–1965	Grimsby Town	4	(1)
1965–1966	Southport	10	(0)
1966–1968	Corby Town		
1968	Cambridge City		
1968–1969	Corby Town		
1969–1973	Gainsborough Trinity		
1973–1975	Arcadia Shepherds		
1975–1976	Gainsborough Trinity		
1976–19??	Louth United		
- * Club domestic league appearances and goals

Leslie Edwin Barratt (born 13 August 1945) is an English former professional footballer who played as an inside forward.
