= 1970–71 Leeds United A.F.C. season =

Leeds United
1970–71 season
- Chairman: Percy Woodward
- Manager: Don Revie
- Stadium: Elland Road
- First Division: 2nd
- FA Cup: Fifth round
- League Cup: Second round
- Inter-Cities Fairs Cup: Winners

The 1970–71 season was Leeds United's 44th season in the Football League, and their seventh consecutive season in the First Division, in which they were runners-up for the second consecutive season. Along with the First Division, they competed in the FA Cup and Football League Cup, being eliminated in the fifth round and the second round respectively, and the Inter-Cities Fairs Cup, which they won for the second time in their history after beating Juventus in the final. The season covers the period from 1 July 1970 to 30 June 1971.

== Competitions ==
=== First Division ===
==== League table ====
Pos	Team	Pld	W	D	L	GF	GA	GAv	Pts	Qualification or relegation
1	Arsenal (C)	42	29	7	6	71	29	2.448	65	Qualification for the European Cup first round
2	Leeds United	42	27	10	5	72	30	2.400	64	Qualification for the UEFA Cup first round
3	Tottenham Hotspur	42	19	14	9	54	33	1.636	52	Qualification for the UEFA Cup first round
4	Wolverhampton Wanderers	42	22	8	12	64	54	1.185	52	Qualification for the UEFA Cup first round
5	Liverpool	42	17	17	8	42	24	1.750	51	Qualification for the European Cup Winners' Cup first round (Note: Liverpool qualified for the European Cup Winners' Cup as FA Cup runners-up, as winners, Arsenal, qualified for the European Cup.)

Source: World Football
Rules for classification: 1) Points; 2) Goal average; 3) Goals scored
(C) Champions

==== Matches ====
Win	Draw	Loss

First Division match details
Date	Opponent	Venue	Result F–A	Scorers	Attendance
15 August 1970	Manchester United	A	1–0	Jones	59,365
19 August 1970	Tottenham Hotspur	A	2–0	Giles, Gray	39,927
22 August 1970	Everton	H	3–2	Bremner (2), Giles	46,718
26 August 1970	West Ham United	H	3–0	Jones, Giles (pen.), Belfitt	42,677
29 August 1970	Burnley	A	3–0	Clarke (2), Jones	26,006
1 September 1970	Arsenal	A	0–0		47,749
5 September 1970	Chelsea	H	1–0	Clarke	47,662
12 September 1970	Stoke City	A	0–3		22,592
19 September 1970	Southampton	H	1–0	Giles (pen.)	32,713
26 September 1970	Nottingham Forest	A	0–0		31,537
3 October 1970	Huddersfield Town	H	2–0	Lorimer (2, 1 pen.)	36,498
10 October 1970	West Bromwich Albion	A	2–2	Clarke, Jones	37,255
17 October 1970	Manchester United	H	2–2	Belfitt, Charlton	50,190
24 October 1970	Derby County	A	2–0	Lorimer, Clarke	32,797
31 October 1970	Coventry City	H	2–0	Charlton, Giles	31,670
7 November 1970	Crystal Palace	A	1–1	Lorimer	37,963
14 November 1970	Blackpool	H	3–1	Madeley, Charlton, Giles	32,921
18 November 1970	Stoke City	H	4–1	Madeley, Clarke, Lorimer, Giles (pen.)	30,549
21 November 1970	Wolverhampton Wanderers	A	3–2	Madeley, Clarke, Holsgrove (o.g.)	41,048
28 November 1970	Manchester City	H	1–0	Clarke	43,511
5 December 1970	Liverpool	A	1–1	Madeley	51,357
12 December 1970	Ipswich Town	H	0–0		29,675
19 December 1970	Everton	A	1–0	Charlton	47,393
26 December 1970	Newcastle United	H	3–0	Clarke, Giles (2, 2 pens.)	46,758
9 January 1971	Tottenham Hotspur	H	1–2	Clarke	43,907
16 January 1971	West Ham United	A	3–2	Hunter, Giles, Belfitt	34,396
30 January 1971	Manchester City	A	2–0	Clarke, Charlton	43,517
6 February 1971	Liverpool	H	0–1		48,425
20 February 1971	Wolverhampton Wanderers	H	3–0	Madeley, Clarke, Giles (pen.)	37,273
23 February 1971	Ipswich Town	A	4–2	Lorimer, Clarke (2), Giles (pen.)	27,264
26 February 1971	Coventry City	A	1–0	Lorimer	20,685
6 March 1971	Derby County	H	1–0	Lorimer	36,467
13 March 1971	Blackpool	A	1–1	Lorimer	27,401
20 March 1971	Crystal Palace	H	2–1	Lorimer, Giles	31,876
27 March 1971	Chelsea	A	1–3	Cooper	58,462
3 April 1971	Burnley	H	4–0	Clarke (4)	31,192
10 April 1971	Newcastle United	A	1–1	Lorimer	49,640
12 April 1971	Huddersfield Town	A	0–0		43,011
17 April 1971	West Bromwich Albion	H	1–2	Clarke	36,812
24 April 1971	Southampton	A	3–0	Hollywood (o.g.), Jones (2)	30,001
26 April 1971	Arsenal	H	1–0	Charlton	48,350
1 May 1971	Nottingham Forest	H	2–0	Bremner, Lorimer	43,083

=== FA Cup ===
Win	Draw	Loss

FA Cup match results
Round	Date	Opponent	Venue	Result F–A	Scorers	Attendance
Third round	11 January 1971	Rotherham United	A	0–0		24,000
Third round replay	18 January 1971	Rotherham United	H	3–2	Lorimer (2), Giles	36,890
Fourth round	23 January 1971	Swindon Town	H	4–0	Jones (3), Clarke	36,985
Fifth round	13 February 1971	Colchester United	A	2–3	Hunter, Giles	16,000

=== League Cup ===
Win	Draw	Loss

League Cup match details
Round	Date	Opponent	Venue	Result F–A	Scorers	Attendance
Second round	8 September 1970	Sheffield United	A	0–1		29,573

=== Inter-Cities Fairs Cup ===
Win	Draw	Loss

Inter-Cities Fairs Cup match details
Round	Date	Opponent	Venue	Result F–A	Scorers	Attendance
First round, first leg	15 September 1970	Sarpsborg FK	A	1–0	Lorimer	10,000
First round, second leg	29 September 1970	Sarpsborg FK	H	5–0	Charlton (2), Bremner (2), Lorimer	19,283
Second round, first leg	21 October 1970	Dynamo Dresden	H	1–0	Lorimer	21,292
Second round, second leg	4 November 1970	Dynamo Dresden	A	1–2 (Note: Leeds win on away goals)	Jones	35,000
Third round, first leg	2 December 1970	Sparta Prague	H	6–0	Clarke, Bremner, Gray (2), Charlton, Chovanec (o.g.)	25,843
Third round, second leg	9 December 1970	Sparta Prague	A	3–2	Gray, Clarke, Belfitt	30,000
Quarter-finals, first leg	10 March 1971	Vitória Setúbal	H	2–1	Lorimer, Giles (pen.)	27,143
Quarter-finals, second leg	24 March 1971	Vitória Setúbal	A	1–1	Lorimer	30,000
Semi-finals, first leg	14 April 1971	Liverpool	A	1–0	Bremner	52,877
Semi-finals, second leg	28 April 1971	Liverpool	H	0–0		40,462
Final, first leg	28 May 1971	Juventus	A	2–2	Madeley, Bates	45,000
Final, second leg	3 June 1971	Juventus	H	1–1	Clarke	42,483
