= Terry Cooper (footballer, born 1944) =

English footballer and manager (1944–2021)

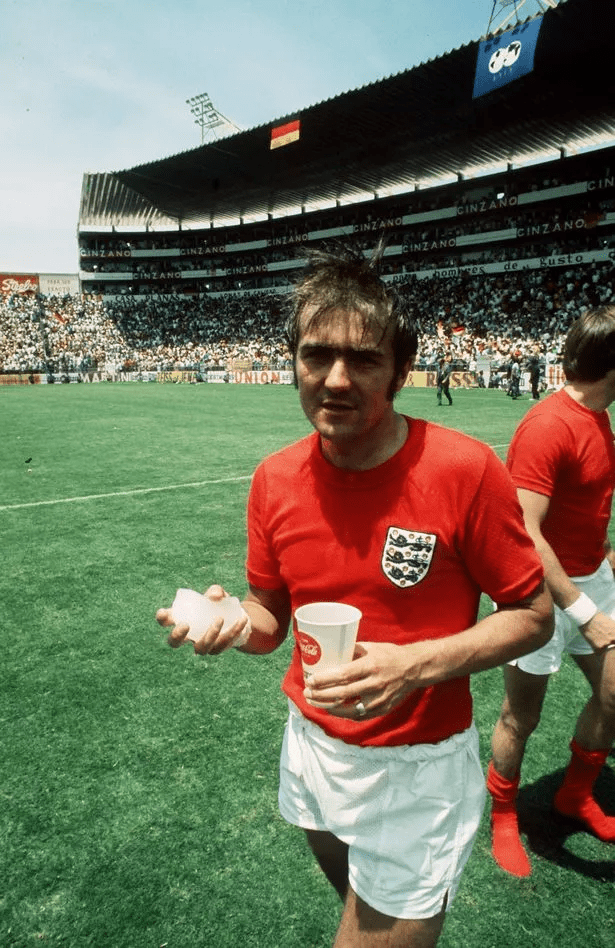
- Cooper at the 1970 FIFA World Cup

Personal information
- Full name: Terence Cooper
- Date of birth: 12 July 1944
- Place of birth: Brotherton, England
- Date of death: 31 July 2021 (aged 77)
- Height: 5 ft 7 1/2 in (1.71 m)
- Position: Left back

Youth career
- Leeds United

Senior career*
Years	Team	Apps	(Gls)
1962–1975	Leeds United	250	(7)
1975–1978	Middlesbrough	105	(1)
1978–1980	Bristol City	11	(0)
1980–1981	Bristol Rovers	59	(0)
1981–1982	Doncaster Rovers	20	(0)
1982–1984	Bristol City	60	(1)
Total		505	(9)

International career
1969–1974	England	20	(0)

Managerial career
- 1980–1981: Bristol Rovers
- 1982–1988: Bristol City
- 1988–1991: Exeter City
- 1991–1993: Birmingham City
- 1994–1995: Exeter City
- * Club domestic league appearances and goals

Terence Cooper (12 July 1944 – 31 July 2021) was an English football player and manager. He was a left back in the Leeds United team of the 1960s and 1970s, and featured for England at the 1970 Mexico World Cup. He later went on to manage both of Bristol's football teams, Birmingham City and was twice manager of Exeter City.

== Early career ==
Cooper was born in Brotherton, West Riding of Yorkshire. He was not discovered as a young player in the conventional manner – he simply turned up at Leeds United one day with his football boots in a paper bag, asking for a trial. He was granted his wish and impressed enough to be offered an apprentice contract.

Initially a left winger, Cooper was converted to a defensive role by Leeds boss Don Revie on signing at the age of 17. He made gradual progress in the first team over the next six years until Revie decided to make him the permanent No. 3 in 1966.

Cooper settled in thereafter earning a reputation as a full back of innovation, showing that the right levels of fitness, skill and an ability to cross the ball meant he could perform a devastating overlap down the left flank to support much-feared winger Eddie Gray. This was so successful it became a trademark of Leeds's play. He could also 'go inside', joining attacks centrally and scoring some important goals.

== 1960s ==
In 1968, Leeds won the League Cup against Arsenal at Wembley. A poor and occasionally high-tempered match was settled by Cooper's volley after a corner had been half-cleared, although Arsenal claimed their goalkeeper had been fouled by central defender Jack Charlton. Cooper subsequently featured in the team which won the Fairs Cup in the same season.

In 1969, Leeds won the League championship with Cooper making his contribution. Revie did not buy a reserve left back but instead used the utility player Paul Madeley to replace Cooper in the event of injury or suspension. He was given his debut for England by Alf Ramsey against France the same year, and England won 5–0 with Cooper putting on a classy individual showing.

== 1970s ==
In the summer of 1970, Cooper gave an excellent series of performances as England's first choice left back at the World Cup in Mexico, which ended with defeat in the quarter-finals to West Germany. Leeds won the Fairs Cup again in 1971 but missed out on the League on the last day.

He seemed set to follow suit the next season as Leeds again chased League and FA Cup honours, but then suffered a broken leg in April 1972 during a League game at Stoke City. Aside from missing that season's FA Cup final victory over Arsenal, Cooper missed a whole 20 months of football due to the complications of the injury. When he did come back, it was with just two appearances in the 1974 season, thereby missing out on a League championship medal – Leeds won it with a 29-match unbeaten start – due to a lack of games.

Cooper's Leeds career was effectively over by the time he regained his fitness. The departure of Revie for the England job in 1974 and the emergence over the next season of Frank Gray, younger brother of Eddie, as well as the continued presence of Trevor Cherry (whom Revie had bought as a central defender in 1972 but had ended up filling in at left back), rendered Cooper surplus to requirements. He left the club in 1975 to join Middlesbrough who were managed by former Leeds teammate Charlton.

== Later career ==
After three years with Middlesbrough, playing more than 100 games, he moved on to Bristol City for two years, before being appointed as player-manager of rivals Bristol Rovers. After an unsuccessful period there, he subsequently assisted and played for his former Leeds skipper Billy Bremner at Doncaster Rovers. He was then approached to become player-manager at Bristol City following their consecutive relegations from the 1st to 4th divisions. Within two seasons, promotion to the Third Division was achieved with a fourth-place finish in 1983–84. Two years later he led the club to their first Wembley visit, winning the Associate Members' Cup Final against Bolton Wanderers in 1986. His management career also took in a period at the helm of Birmingham City sandwiched between two spells at Exeter City.

== Personal life ==
Cooper and his wife Rosemary had three children. His son, Mark, and grandson, Charlie, also became footballers.

Cooper died on 31 July 2021, aged 77.

== Honours ==
=== Player ===
Leeds United

- Football League First Division: 1968–69
- Football League Cup: 1967–68
- FA Charity Shield: 1969
- Inter-Cities Fairs Cup: 1967–68, 1970–71; runner-up: 1966–67
- FA Cup runner-up: 1969–70

Individual

- Rothmans Golden Boots Awards: 1970, 1971, 1972

=== Manager ===
Bristol City

- Football League Fourth Division promotion: 1983–84
- Associate Members' Cup: 1985–86; runner-up: 1986–87

Exeter City

- Football League Fourth Division: 1989–90

Birmingham City

- Football League Third Division promotion: 1991–92
