= 1963–64 Leeds United A.F.C. season =

Leeds United
1963–64 season
- Chairman: Harry Reynolds
- Manager: Don Revie
- Stadium: Elland Road
- Second Division: 1st (promoted)
- FA Cup: Fourth round
- League Cup: Fourth round
- Highest home attendance: 41,167 vs. Sunderland, Second Division, 26 December 1963
- Lowest home attendance: 9,843 vs. Mansfield Town, League Cup, 25 September 1963
- Average home league attendance: 29,951

The 1963–64 season was Leeds United's 37th season in the Football League, and their fourth consecutive season in the Football League Second Division, the second tier of English football, where they finished first, and won promotion back to the First Division. Alongside the Second Division, the club competed in the FA Cup and the Football League Cup, being eliminated in the fourth round of both competitions.

== Competitions ==
=== Second Division ===
==== League table ====
| Pos | Team | Pld | W | D | L | GF | GA | GAv | Pts | Qualification or relegation |
|---|---|---|---|---|---|---|---|---|---|---|
| 1 | Leeds United (C, P) | 42 | 24 | 15 | 3 | 71 | 34 | 2.088 | 63 | Promotion to the First Division |
| 2 | Sunderland (P) | 42 | 25 | 11 | 6 | 81 | 37 | 2.189 | 61 | Promotion to the First Division |
| 3 | Preston North End | 42 | 23 | 10 | 9 | 79 | 54 | 1.463 | 56 | |
| 4 | Charlton Athletic | 42 | 19 | 10 | 13 | 76 | 70 | 1.086 | 48 | |
| 5 | Southampton | 42 | 19 | 9 | 14 | 100 | 73 | 1.370 | 47 | |

Rules for classification: 1) Points; 2) Goal average; 3) Goals scored
(C) Champions; (P) Promoted

==== Matches ====
| Win | Draw | Loss |

Second Division match results
| Date | Opponent | Venue | Result F–A | Scorers | Attendance |
|---|---|---|---|---|---|
| 28 August 1963 | Rotherham United | Home | 1–0 | Weston | 22,517 |
| 31 August 1963 | Bury | Home | 3–0 | Collins, Storrie, Johanneson | 26,041 |
| 3 September 1963 | Rotherham United | Away | 2–2 | Charlton, Johanneson | 14,178 |
| 7 September 1963 | Manchester City | Away | 2–3 | Lawson, Johanneson | 29,186 |
| 11 September 1963 | Portsmouth | Home | 3–1 | Storrie, Weston, Bremner | 24,926 |
| 14 September 1963 | Swindon Town | Home | 0–0 | | 33,301 |
| 18 September 1963 | Portsmouth | Away | 1–1 | Henderson | 12,569 |
| 21 September 1963 | Cardiff City | Away | 0–0 | | 16,117 |
| 28 September 1963 | Norwich City | Home | 4–2 | Weston (2), Johanneson, Collins pen. | 22,804 |
| 1 October 1963 | Northampton Town | Away | 3–0 | Lawson, Weston, Collins | 15,079 |
| 5 October 1963 | Scunthorpe United | Away | 1–0 | Lawson | 10,793 |
| 9 October 1963 | Middlesbrough | Home | 2–0 | Hunter, Collins | 36,919 |
| 12 October 1963 | Huddersfield Town | Away | 2–0 | Giles, Weston | 31,220 |
| 19 October 1963 | Derby County | Home | 2–2 | Charlton, Weston | 29,864 |
| 26 October 1963 | Southampton | Away | 4–1 | Lawson (2), Giles, Johanneson | 18,036 |
| 2 November 1963 | Charlton Athletic | Home | 1–1 | Charlton | 32,344 |
| 9 November 1963 | Grimsby Town | Away | 2–0 | Lawson, Weston | 12,194 |
| 16 November 1963 | Preston North End | Home | 1–1 | Johanneson | 33,841 |
| 23 November 1963 | Leyton Orient | Away | 2–0 | Collins, Johanneson | 12,072 |
| 30 November 1963 | Swansea Town | Home | 2–1 | Johanneson, Bell | 21,870 |
| 7 December 1963 | Plymouth Argyle | Away | 1–0 | Johanneson | 9,918 |
| 14 December 1963 | Northampton Town | Home | 0–0 | | 21,108 |
| 21 December 1963 | Bury | Away | 2–1 | Weston, Lawson | 7,453 |
| 26 December 1963 | Sunderland | Home | 1–1 | Lawson | 41,167 |
| 28 December 1963 | Sunderland | Away | 0–2 | | 55,046 |
| 11 January 1964 | Manchester City | Home | 1–0 | Weston | 33,737 |
| 18 January 1964 | Swindon Town | Away | 2–2 | Giles, Hunter | 19,015 |
| 1 February 1964 | Cardiff City | Home | 1–1 | Johanneson | 28,039 |
| 8 February 1964 | Norwich City | Away | 2–2 | Weston, Peacock | 20,843 |
| 15 February 1964 | Scunthorpe United | Home | 1–0 | Johanneson | 28,868 |
| 22 February 1964 | Huddersfield Town | Home | 1–1 | Storrie | 36,439 |
| 3 March 1964 | Preston North End | Away | 0–2 | | 35,612 |
| 7 March 1964 | Southampton | Home | 3–1 | Lawson, Collins, Johanneson | 24,077 |
| 14 March 1964 | Middlesbrough | Away | 3–1 | Lawson, Peacock, Giles | 15,986 |
| 21 March 1964 | Grimsby Town | Home | 3–1 | Lawson, Bremner, Peacock | 25,351 |
| 27 March 1964 | Newcastle United | Away | 1–0 | Giles | 55,038 |
| 28 March 1964 | Derby County | Away | 1–1 | Peacock | 16,757 |
| 30 March 1964 | Newcastle United | Home | 2–1 | Weston, Johanneson | 40,105 |
| 4 April 1964 | Leyton Orient | Home | 2–1 | Giles, Weston | 30,920 |
| 11 April 1964 | Swansea Town | Away | 3–0 | Peacock (2), Giles | 14,321 |
| 18 April 1964 | Plymouth Argyle | Home | 1–1 | Bell | 34,725 |
| 25 April 1964 | Charlton Athletic | Away | 2–0 | Peacock (2) | 21,323 |

=== FA Cup ===
FA Cup match details
| Round | Date | Opponent | Venue | Result F–A | Scorers | Attendance |
|---|---|---|---|---|---|---|
| Third round | 4 January 1964 | Cardiff City | Away | 1–0 | Bremner | 13,932 |
| Fourth round | 25 January 1964 | Everton | Home | 1–1 | Lawson | 48,286 |
| Fourth round replay | 28 January 1964 | Everton | Away | 0–2 | | 66,167 |

=== League Cup ===
League Cup match details
| Round | Date | Opponent | Venue | Result F–A | Scorers | Attendance |
|---|---|---|---|---|---|---|
| Second round | 25 September 1963 | Mansfield Town | Home | 5–1 | Lawson (2), Bell, Johanneson (2) | 9,843 |
| Third round | 22 October 1963 | Swansea Town | Home | 2–0 | Lawson, Storrie | 10,748 |
| Fourth round | 27 November 1963 | Manchester City | Away | 1–3 | Weston | 10,769 |
