= Paul Reaney =

English footballer

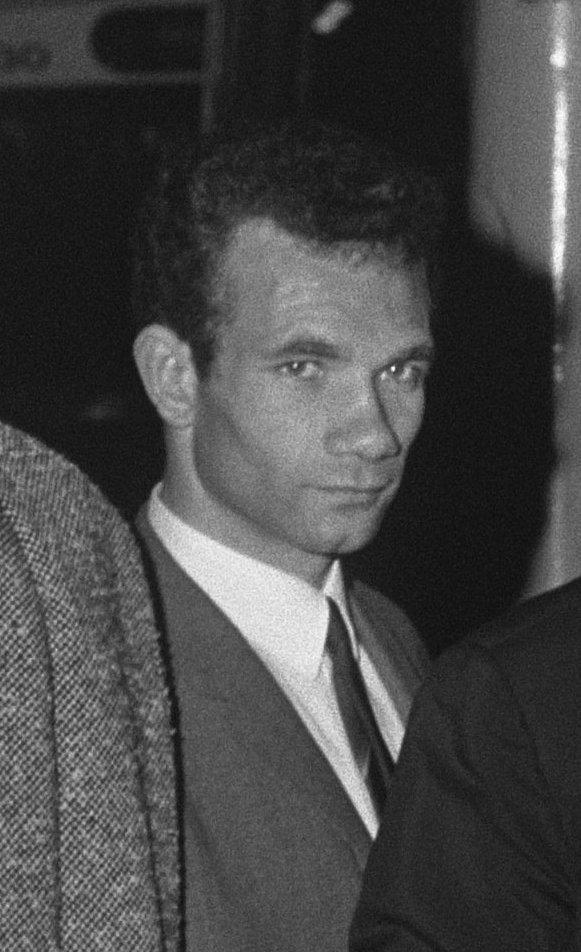
- Reaney in 1969

Personal information
- Date of birth: 22 October 1944 (age 82)
- Place of birth: Fulham, London, England
- Height: 5 ft 10 in (1.78 m)
- Position: Right back

Youth career
- 1962–1964: Leeds United

Senior career*
Years	Team	Apps	(Gls)
1962–1978	Leeds United	556	(6)
1978–1980	Bradford City	38	(0)
1980–1981	Newcastle KB United	53	(0)
Total		649	(6)

International career
1968–1971	England	3	(0)
- * Club domestic league appearances and goals

Paul Reaney (born 22 October 1944) is an English former international footballer. He played primarily as a right-sided full-back. He made 745 first-team appearances at Leeds United from 1962 to 1978, winning seven major trophies under Don Revie's management. As a player of mixed race, Reaney became the second non-white footballer (after Frank Soo) to represent the men's senior England national football team in 1968, when he gained the first of his three senior caps. Later in his career, Reaney played for Bradford City and Newcastle KB United.

== Career ==
=== Leeds United ===
Reaney moved to the West Riding of Yorkshire from London as a child and left school at 15. He was briefly a car mechanic before Don Revie signed him for Leeds as an apprentice. He made his professional debut shortly before his 18th birthday, and went on to make 35 League appearances in his first season, and was part of the team that won the Second Division in 1964.

In the 1964–65 season, Reaney missed just one League game, and scored the first of his League goals as Leeds challenged for both the League championship and FA Cup; however, Leeds lost out on both trophies, with Manchester United winning the title, whilst Liverpool beat Leeds in the FA Cup final.

Reaney quickly earned a reputation as a fiercely competitive, disciplined defender, capable of closing out the most talented of attackers – George Best rated Reaney as one of the two best defenders he played against.

In 1967–68 Leeds won the League Cup and the Fairs Cup, and in 1968–69 they won the League championship. Leeds progressed in 1969–70 towards a "treble" of League championship, FA Cup and European Cup, but a broken leg suffered in a game against West Ham United meant that he missed the run-in to the end of the season – a factor that contributed to Leeds missing out on all three trophies. In addition, the broken leg meant that Reaney missed that summer's World Cup in Mexico.

He eventually returned in the 1970–71 season to make 18 League appearances and be part of the team which won its second Fairs Cup, but which missed out on the League championship again. In the 1971–72 season he was part of the team that won the FA Cup, but which missed out the League Championship yet again. The following season saw more disappointment for Reaney as Leeds lost the FA Cup final to Sunderland and a controversial European Cup Winners Cup final to A.C. Milan.

Reaney's career at Leeds passed 500 appearances in 1973–74 as Leeds embarked on a 29-match unbeaten start to the season to earn the League title for the second time under Revie, who then left to take over the England job. Reaney was in the team which duly progressed to the European Cup final the following season in 1974–75 but was controversially defeated 2–0 by Bayern Munich.

=== Later career ===
Reaney remained at Elland Road until the end of the 1977–78 season when he was given a free transfer after 745 appearances. He joined neighbours Bradford City and then completed his playing career in Australia with Newcastle KB United.

== International career ==
In 1968, Reaney won his first England cap, when he came on as a substitute in a match against Bulgaria. Reaney's appearance for England has assumed greater importance in recent years as even though he was regarded as "white" during his playing career, he is viewed by many as "black" or mixed race today. His England debut was nine years before that of Viv Anderson, who is widely credited as the first black player to appear for England.

From that point on, he was regularly selected for the England squad (albeit not as first choice full-back) until a broken leg in 1970 prevented him from playing in the World Cup. The following year, he made his third and final appearance for England in a match against Malta.

== Post-playing career ==
Since returning to England from Australia, Reaney has been running coaching sessions during school holidays for children at Potters Leisure Resort in Hopton.

In 1993, burglars broke into Reaney's home and stole a safe containing his collection of medals, though left behind his trophies, caps and other honours.

== Honours ==
Leeds United

- Football League First Division: 1968–69, 1973–74
- Football League Second Division: 1963–64
- FA Cup: 1971–72; runner-up: 1964–65, 1972–73
- Football League Cup: 1967–68
- FA Charity Shield: 1969
- Inter-Cities Fairs Cup: 1967–68, 1970–71; runner-up: 1966–67
- European Cup runner-up: 1974–75
- European Cup Winners' Cup runner-up: 1972–73
