= Jimmy Tugman =

English footballer

Personal information
- Full name: James Robert Tugman
- Date of birth: 14 March 1945 (age 81)
- Place of birth: Workington, England
- Position: Left back

Senior career*
Years	Team	Apps	(Gls)
1965–1968	Workington	43	(0)
- Netherfield
- * Club domestic league appearances and goals

James Robert Tugman (born 14 March 1945) is an English former professional footballer who played in the Football League as a left back.
