= 1972–73 Leeds United A.F.C. season =

Leeds United
1972–73 season
- Chairman: Manny Cussins
- Manager: Don Revie
- Stadium: Elland Road
- First Division: 3rd
- FA Cup: Runners-up
- League Cup: Fourth round
- Cup Winners' Cup: Runners-up

The 1972–73 season was Leeds United's ninth consecutive season in the Football League First Division, the top tier of English football, where they finished 3rd, seven points behind winners Liverpool. Alongside the First Division, the club competed in the FA Cup, Football League Cup and the European Cup Winners' Cup. Leeds were runners up in both the FA Cup, where they lost 1–0 to Second Division club Sunderland in the final, and the European Cup Winners' Cup, where they lost 1–0 to AC Milan in the final. They were eliminated from the Football League Cup in the fourth round.

== Competitions ==
=== Football League First Division ===
==== League table ====
Pos	Team	Pld	W	D	L	GF	GA	GAv	Pts	Qualification or relegation
1	Liverpool (C)	42	25	10	7	72	42	1.714	60	Qualification for the European Cup first round
2	Arsenal	42	23	11	8	57	43	1.326	57	
3	Leeds United	42	21	11	10	71	45	1.578	53	Qualification for the UEFA Cup first round
4	Ipswich Town	42	17	14	11	55	45	1.222	48	Qualification for the UEFA Cup first round
5	Wolverhampton Wanderers	42	18	11	13	66	54	1.222	47	Qualification for the UEFA Cup first round

Source: World Football
Rules for classification: 1) Points; 2) Goal average; 3) Goals scored
(C) Champions

==== Matches ====
First Division match results
Date	Opponent	Venue	Result F–A	Scorers	Attendance
12 August 1972	Chelsea	Away	0–4		51,102
15 August 1972	Sheffield United	Away	2–0	Colquhoun (o.g.), Giles (pen.)	40,159
19 August 1972	West Bromwich Albion	Home	2–0	Clarke, Giles (pen.)	36,555
23 August 1972	Ipswich Town	Home	3–3	Jordan (2), Giles (pen.)	32,461
26 August 1972	Tottenham Hotspur	Away	0–0		41,191
30 August 1972	Southampton	Home	1–0	Bremner	31,401
2 September 1972	Norwich City	Home	2–0	Jordan, Charlton	34,261
9 September 1972	Stoke City	Away	2–2	Lorimer, Clarke	26,705
16 September 1972	Leicester City	Home	3–1	Clarke, Jones, Bates	33,930
23 September 1972	Newcastle United	Away	2–3	Clarke, Jones	38,962
30 September 1972	Liverpool	Home	1–2	Jones	46,468
7 October 1972	Derby County	Home	5–0	Giles (2), Clarke, Bremner, Lorimer	36,477
14 October 1972	Everton	Away	2–1	Jones, Jordan	47,821
21 October 1972	Coventry City	Home	1–1	Charlton	36,240
28 October 1972	Wolverhampton Wanderers	Away	2–0	E. Gray, Lorimer	33,731
4 November 1972	Ipswich Town	Away	2–2	Charlton, Lorimer	27,566
11 November 1972	Sheffield United	Home	2–1	Clarke (2)	31,600
18 November 1972	Crystal Palace	Away	2–2	Jones, Giles	30,107
25 November 1972	Manchester City	Home	3–0	Cherry, Lorimer, Clarke	39,879
2 December 1972	Arsenal	Away	1–2	Lorimer (pen.)	39,108
9 December 1972	West Ham United	Home	1–0	Jones	30,270
16 December 1972	Birmingham City	Home	4–0	Clarke (2), Lorimer, Jones	25,285
23 December 1972	Manchester United	Away	1–1	Clarke	46,382
26 December 1972	Newcastle United	Home	1–0	Jordan	45,486
6 January 1973	Tottenham Hotspur	Home	2–1	Jones, Lorimer (pen.)	32,404
20 January 1973	Norwich City	Away	2–1	Jordan, Clarke	27,447
27 January 1973	Stoke City	Home	1–0	Clarke	33,487
10 February 1973	Leicester City	Away	0–2		35,976
17 February 1973	Chelsea	Home	1–1	Jones	41,781
3 March 1973	Derby County	Away	3–2	Lorimer (2, 2 pens.), Clarke	38,100
10 March 1973	Everton	Home	2–1	Clarke, Lorimer	39,663
24 March 1973	Wolverhampton Wanderers	Home	0–0		39,078
28 March 1973	West Bromwich Albion	Away	1–1	Clarke	33,057
31 March 1973	Manchester City	Away	0–1		35,772
2 April 1973	Coventry City	Away	1–0	Reaney	24,383
14 April 1973	West Ham United	Away	1–1	Clarke	38,804
18 April 1973	Manchester United	Home	0–1		45,450
21 April 1973	Crystal Palace	Home	4–0	Bremner, Lorimer, F. Gray, Clarke	31,173
23 April 1973	Liverpool	Away	0–2		55,738
28 April 1973	Southampton	Away	1–3	Hunter	24,108
30 April 1973	Birmingham City	Away	1–2	Jordan	34,449
9 May 1973	Arsenal	Home	6–1	Lorimer (3, 1 pen.), Bremner, Jordan (2)	25,088

=== FA Cup ===
Win	Draw	Loss

FA Cup match results
Round	Date	Opponent	Venue	Result F–A	Scorers	Attendance
Third round	13 January 1973	Norwich City	Away	1–1	Lorimer	32,310
Third round replay	17 January 1973	Norwich City	Home	1–1 (a.e.t.)	Giles	36,087
Third round, second replay	29 January 1973	Norwich City	Neutral	5–0	Clarke (3), Jones, Lorimer	33,225
Fourth round	3 February 1973	Plymouth Argyle	Home	2–1	Clarke, Bates	38,374
Fifth round	24 February 1973	West Bromwich Albion	Home	2–0	Clarke (2)	39,229
Sixth round	17 March 1973	Derby County	Away	1–0	Lorimer	38,350
Semi-final	7 April 1973	Wolverhampton Wanderers	Neutral	1–0	Bremner	52,505
Final	5 May 1973	Sunderland	Neutral	0–1		100,000

=== League Cup ===
Win	Draw	Loss

League Cup match details
Round	Date	Opponent	Venue	Result F–A	Scorers	Attendance
Second round	6 September 1972	Barnsley	Home	4–0	Lorimer (2), Jones, Cherry	20,857
Third round	4 October 1972	Aston Villa	Away	1–1	Charlton	46,185
Third round replay	11 October 1972	Aston Villa	Home	2–0	Nicholl (o.g.), Jones	28,894
Fourth round	31 October 1972	Liverpool	Away	2–2	Jones, Lorimer	44,609
Fourth round replay	22 November 1972	Liverpool	Home	0–1		34,856

=== European Cup Winners' Cup ===
Win	Draw	Loss

Cup Winners' Cup match details
Round	Date	Opponent	Venue	Result F–A	Scorers	Attendance
First round, first leg	13 September 1972	MKE Ankaragücü	Away	1–1	Jordan	20,000
First round, second leg	27 September 1972	MKE Ankaragücü	Home	1–0	Jones	22,411
Second round, first leg	25 October 1972	Carl Zeiss Jena	Away	0–0		18,000
Second round, second leg	8 November 1972	Carl Zeiss Jena	Home	2–0	Cherry, Jones	26,885
Third round, first leg	7 March 1973	Rapid București	Home	5–0	Giles, Clarke, Lorimer (2), Jordan	25,702
Third round, second leg	21 March 1973	Rapid București	Away	3–1	Bates, Jones, Jordan	25,000
Semi-final, first leg	11 April 1973	Hajduk Split	Home	1–0	Clarke	32,051
Semi-final, second leg	25 April 1973	Hajduk Split	Away	0–0		30,000
Final	16 May 1973	AC Milan	Neutral	0–1		45,000
