= 1969 FA Charity Shield =

Leeds United	Manchester City
2	1
- Date: 2 August 1969
- Venue: Elland Road, Leeds
- Referee: Ken Burns
- Attendance: 39,835

The 1969 FA Charity Shield was the 47th FA Charity Shield, an annual football match played between the winners of the previous season's Football League and FA Cup competitions. The match was contested by the league champions, Leeds United, and Manchester City, the cup winners. Leeds won the match 2–1, with goals from Eddie Gray and Jack Charlton. Colin Bell scored a consolation for City.

This match saw the début of Allan Clarke for Leeds United following his £165,000 transfer from Leicester City during the summer. Clarke was on the losing side to Manchester City in the previous season's FA Cup. Leeds took the lead after Giles' long ball into the box was headed across the six yard box for Gray to score. Leeds increased their lead three minutes later when Charlton headed in a free kick form Giles. Manchester City scored a late goal when Bell shot in following a goalkeeper error at a corner kick.

== Match details ==
2 August 1969

Leeds United	2–1	Manchester City
Gray 55'; Charlton 58'	Report	Bell 90'

Elland Road, Leeds
Attendance: 39,835
Referee: K. H. Burns

Leeds United	Manchester City

GK	(Wales) Gary Sprake
RB	(England) Paul Reaney
LB	(England) Terry Cooper
RH	(Scotland) Billy Bremner (c)
CH	(England) Jack Charlton
LH	(England) Norman Hunter
OR	(England) Paul Madeley
IR	(England) Allan Clarke
CF	(England) Mick Jones
IL	(Republic of Ireland) Johnny Giles
OL	(Scotland) Eddie Gray
Substitute
(Scotland) Peter Lorimer
Manager:
(England) Don Revie

GK	(England) Joe Corrigan
RB	(England) Tony Book (c)
LB	(England) Glyn Pardoe
RH	(England) Mike Doyle
CH	(England) Tommy Booth
LH	(England) Alan Oakes
OR	(England) Mike Summerbee
IR	(England) Colin Bell
CF	(England) Francis Lee
IL	(England) Neil Young
OL	(England) Tony Coleman
Manager:
(England) Joe Mercer
