= 1967–68 Inter-Cities Fairs Cup =

Tournament details
- Teams: 48

Final positions
- Champions: (England) Leeds United (1st title)
- Runners-up: (Hungary) Ferencváros

Tournament statistics
- Matches played: 94
- Top scorer: (Scotland) Peter Lorimer (8 goals)

The tenth Inter-Cities Fairs Cup was played over the 1967–68 season. The competition was won by Leeds United over two legs in the final against Ferencváros. It was the first English victory in the competition, despite sides from the country having finished as defeated finalists on four previous occasions. English clubs went on to win the cup on the final four occasions it was contested.

== First round ==
Team 1	Agg.	Team 2	1st leg	2nd leg
DWS (Netherlands)	2–4	(Scotland) Dundee FC	2–1	0–3
PAOK (Greece)	2–5	(Belgium) RFC Liegeois	0–2	2–3
Eintracht Frankfurt (West Germany)	0–5	(England) Nottingham Forest	0–1	0–4
Zürich (Switzerland)	3–2	(Spain) Barcelona	3–1	0–1
Club Brugge (Belgium)	1–2	(Portugal) Sporting CP	0–0	1–2
Nice (France)	0–5	(Italy) Fiorentina	0–1	0–4
Dynamo Dresden (East Germany)	2–3	(Scotland) Rangers FC	1–1	1–2
1. FC Köln (West Germany)	4–2	(Czechoslovakia) TJ Slavia Praha	2–0	2–2
FK Partizan (Socialist Federal Republic of Yugoslavia)	6–2	(Bulgaria) PFC Lokomotiv Plovdiv	5–1	1–1
CA Spora Luxembourg	0–16	(England) Leeds United	0–9	0–7
Napoli (Italy)	5–1	(West Germany) Hannover 96	4–0	1–1
Hibernian (Scotland)	4–3	(Portugal) Porto	3–0	1–3
DOS Utrecht (Netherlands)	4–5	(Spain) Zaragoza	3–2	1–3
Argeş Piteşti (Romania)	3–5	(Hungary) Ferencváros	3–1	0–4
Malmö FF (Sweden)	1–4	(England) Liverpool	0–2	1–2
Servette FC (Switzerland)	2–6	(West Germany) TSV 1860 München	2–2	0–4
St. Patrick's Athletic (Republic of Ireland)	4–9	(France) FC Girondins de Bordeaux	1–3	3–6
BK Frem (Denmark)	2–4	(Spain) Athletic Bilbao	0–1	2–3
Bologna (Italy)	2–0	(Norway) Lyn	2–0	0–0
Dinamo Zagreb (Socialist Federal Republic of Yugoslavia)	5–2	(Romania) Petrolul Ploieşti	5–0	0–2
FK Vojvodina (Socialist Federal Republic of Yugoslavia)	4–1	(Portugal) GD CUF	1–0	3–1
1. FC Lokomotive Leipzig (East Germany)	5–2	(Northern Ireland) Linfield	5–1	0–1
Wiener Sportclub (Austria)	3–7	(Spain) Atlético Madrid	2–5	1–2
Royal Antwerp (Belgium)	1–2	(Turkey) Göztepe A.Ş.	1–2	0–0

=== First leg ===
13 September 1967

St. Patrick's Athletic (Republic of Ireland)	1–3	(France) Bordeaux
Hennessy 71'	Report	Chorda 5' (pen.); Massé 35'; Couécou 88'

Dalymount Park, Dublin
Attendance: 4,800
Referee: Richard Henderson (Scotland)

19 September 1967

Napoli (Italy)	4–0	(West Germany) Hannover 96
Girardo 14'; Laszig 17' (o.g.); Altafini 37' 73'

Naples

20 September 1967

Hibernian (Scotland)	3–0	(Portugal) Porto
Cormack 26', 37'; Stevenson 46'

Easter Road, Edinburgh
Attendance: 14,200
Referee: John Adair (Northern Ireland)

19 September 1967

Bologna (Italy)	2–0	(Norway) Lyn
Clerici 42'; Pace 53'

Bologna

20 September 1967

Argeș Pitești (Romania)	3–1	(Hungary) Ferencváros
Jercan 2', 54'; Dobrin 48'	Report	Albert 22'

Stadionul 1 Mai, Pitești
Attendance: 22,000
Referee: Božidar Botić (Yugoslavia)

20 September 1967

Eintracht Frankfurt (Germany)	0–1	(England) Nottingham Forest
	Report	Baker 9'

Deutsche Bank Park, Frankfurt am Main
Attendance: 4,500
Referee: Zariquiegui Izco (Spain)

20 September 1967

Nice (France)	0–1	(Italy) Fiorentina
		Maraschi 78'

Nice

20 September 1967

Dinamo Zagreb (Socialist Federal Republic of Yugoslavia)	5–0	(Romania) Petrolul Ploiești
Jukić 51', 65'; Kiš 57', 59'; Zambata 77'	Report

Stadion Maksimir, Zagreb
Attendance: 20,000
Referee: Gerhard Kunze (West Germany)

3 October 1967

CA Spora Luxembourg	0–9	(England) Leeds United
		Lorimer 14' 24'pen 29' 54'; Bremner 45'; Greenhoff 70' 77'; Madeley 80'; Jones 81'

Stade Josy Barthel, Luxembourg
Attendance: 2,500
Referee: Helmut Fritz (West Germany)

13 September 1967

PAOK (Greece)	0–2	(Belgium) RFC Liegeois
		Martaga 3'; Banović 10'

Kaftanzoglio Stadium, Thessaloniki
Referee: Monti (Italy)

27 September 1967

FK Vojvodina (Socialist Federal Republic of Yugoslavia)	1–0	(Portugal) GD CUF
Dakić 33' (pen.)

Stadion Vojvodine, Novi Sad
Attendance: 3,600
Referee: Dimitar Rumentchev (Bulgaria)

=== Second leg ===
27 September 1967

Petrolul Ploiești (Romania)	2–0	(Socialist Federal Republic of Yugoslavia) Dinamo Zagreb
Dridea 15'; Grozea 70'	Report

Stadionul Petrolul, Ploiești
Attendance: 10,000
Referee: Orhan Gonül (Turkey)

Dinamo Zagreb won 5–2 on aggregate.

4 October 1967

Lyn (Norway)	0–0	(Italy) Bologna

Oslo

Bologna won 2–0 on aggregate.

11 October 1967

Ferencváros (Hungary)	4–0	(Romania) Argeș Pitești
Albert 37', 65'; Novák 50' (pen.); Varga 79'	Report

Népstadion, Budapest
Attendance: 80,000
Referee: Václav Davídek (Czechoslovakia)

Ferencváros won 5–3 on aggregate.

11 October 1967

(France) Bordeaux	6–3	St. Patrick's Athletic (Republic of Ireland)
Calléja 13'; Ruiter 21'; Duhayot 43'; Duhayot 53'; Wojciak 65'; Wojciak 88'	Report	Campbell 23'; Campbell 25'; Ryan 61'

Parc Lescure, Bordeaux
Attendance: 5,000
Referee: Heymann (Switzerland)

Bordeaux won 9–4 on aggregate.

11 October 1967

Fiorentina (Italy)	4–0	(France) Nice
De Sisti 9'; Brugnera 53' 68'; Bertini 63'

Florence

Fiorentina won 5–0 on aggregate.

17 October 1967

Leeds United (England)	7–0	CA Spora Luxembourg
Johanneson 10', 35', 81'; Greenhoff 51', 69'; Cooper 60'; Lorimer 67'

Elland Road, Leeds
Attendance: 15,196
Referee: Peter Coates (Republic of Ireland)

Leeds won 16–0 on aggregate.

17 October 1967
19:30

Nottingham Forest (England)	4–0	(Germany) Eintracht Frankfurt
Baker 13', 35'; Chapman 47'; Lyons 53'

City Ground, Nottingham
Attendance: 27,090
Referee: Haken Oberg (Sweden)

Forest won 5–0 on aggregate.

18 October 1967

Hannover 96 (West Germany)	1–1	(Italy) Napoli
Straschitz 65'		Barison 40'

Hanover

Napoli won 5–1 on aggregate.

4 October 1967

(Portugal) Porto	3–1	Hibernian (Scotland)
Custódio Pinto 54'; Valdir 55', 69'		Davis 2' (pen.)

Estádio das Antas, Porto
Attendance: 40,000
Referee: Antonio Rigo Sureda (Spain)

Hibernian won 4–3 on aggregate.

20 September 1967

RFC Liegeois (Belgium)	3–2	(Greece) PAOK
Andrie 10' Martaga 30' 66'		Afentoulidis 28'; Makris 80'

Vélodrome de Rocourt, Liège
Referee: Rasmussen (Norway)

RFC Liégeois won 5-2 on aggregate.

8 October 1967

GD CUF (Portugal)	1–3	(Socialist Federal Republic of Yugoslavia) FK Vojvodina
Oliveira 14'		Trivić 72', 73'; Zemko 86'

Estádio Alfredo da Silva, Barreiro
Attendance: 4,230
Referee: Gaspar Pintado Viú (Spain)

FK Vojvodina won 4–1 on aggregate.

== Second round ==
Team 1	Agg.	Team 2	1st leg	2nd leg
Dundee FC (Scotland)	7–2	(Belgium) RFC Liegeois	3–1	4–1
Nottingham Forest (England)	2 – 2(a)	(Switzerland) FC Zürich	2–1	0–1
Sporting CP (Portugal)	3–2	(Italy) Fiorentina	2–1	1–1
Rangers FC (Scotland)	4–3	(West Germany) 1. FC Köln	3–0	1 – 3(aet)
FK Partizan (Socialist Federal Republic of Yugoslavia)	2–3	(England) Leeds United	1–2	1–1
Napoli (Italy)	4–6	(Scotland) Hibernian	4–1	0–5
Zaragoza (Spain)	2–4	(Hungary) Ferencváros	2–1	0–3
Liverpool F.C. (England)	9–2	(West Germany) TSV 1860 München	8–0	1–2
FC Girondins de Bordeaux (France)	1–4	(Spain) Athletic Bilbao	1–3	0–1
Bologna (Italy)	2–1	(Socialist Federal Republic of Yugoslavia) Dinamo Zagreb	0–0	2–1
FK Vojvodina (Socialist Federal Republic of Yugoslavia)	2–0	(East Germany) 1. FC Lokomotive Leipzig	0–0	2–0
Atlético Madrid (Spain)	2–3	(Turkey) Göztepe A.Ş.	2–0	0–3

=== First leg ===
31 October 1967
19:30

Nottingham Forest (England)	2-1	(Switzerland) FC Zürich
Newton 49'; Storey-Moore 71'		Künzli 63'

City Ground, Nottingham
Attendance: 32,896
Referee: J Lacoste (France)

29 November 1967

FK Partizan (Socialist Federal Republic of Yugoslavia)	1–2	(England) Leeds United
Paunović 87'		Lorimer 24'; Belfitt 53'

Stadion Partizana, Belgrade
Attendance: 10,000
Referee: Dogan Babacan (Turkey)

6 December 1967

Sporting CP (Portugal)	2–1	(Italy) Fiorentina
Lourenço 4'; Fernando Peres 74' (pen.)		Magli 62'

Lisbon

22 November 1967

Napoli (Italy)	4–1	(Scotland) Hibernian
Cané 20' 50' 85'; Altafini 68'		Stein 80'

Naples

15 November 1967

Bologna (Italy)	0–0	(Socialist Federal Republic of Yugoslavia) Dinamo Zagreb

Bologna

=== Second leg ===
14 November 1967

(Switzerland) FC Zürich	1-0	Nottingham Forest (England)
Winiger 72'

Letzigrund, Zürich
Attendance: 12,000
Referee: F Geluck (Belgium)

FC Zürich won on away goals

13 December 1967

Fiorentina (Italy)	1–1	(Portugal) Sporting CP
Maraschi 20'		Fernando Peres 57'

Florence

Sporting CP won 3–2 on aggregate.

29 November 1967

Hibernian (Scotland)	5–0	(Italy) Napoli
Duncan 5'; Quinn 44'; Cormack 66'; Stanton 67'; Stein 77'

Edinburgh

Hibernian won 6–4 on aggregate.

6 December 1967

Leeds United (England)	1–1	(Socialist Federal Republic of Yugoslavia) FK Partizan
Lorimer 29'		M. Petrović 61'

Elland Road, Leeds
Attendance: 34,258
Referee: Othmar Huber (Switzerland)

Leeds won 3–2 on aggregate.

22 November 1967

Dinamo Zagreb (Socialist Federal Republic of Yugoslavia)	1–2	(Italy) Bologna
Belin 68'		Haller 45'; Pace 88'

Zagreb

Bologna won 2–1 on aggregate.

== Third round ==
Team 1	Agg.	Team 2	1st leg	2nd leg
FC Zürich (Switzerland)	3–1	(Portugal) Sporting CP	3–0	0–1
Leeds United (England)	2–1	(Scotland) Hibernian	1–0	1–1
Ferencváros (Hungary)	2–0	(England) Liverpool F.C.	1–0	1–0
FK Vojvodina (Socialist Federal Republic of Yugoslavia)	2–0	(Turkey) Göztepe A.Ş.	1–0	1–0

Dundee FC, Rangers FC, Athletic Bilbao and Bologna received byes to the Quarter-Finals.

=== First leg ===
20 December 1967

Leeds United (England)	1–0	(Scotland) Hibernian
E Gray 4'

Elland Road, Leeds
Attendance: 31,522
Referee: Jack Russell (Northern Ireland)

=== Second leg ===
10 January 1968

Hibernian (Scotland)	1–1	(England) Leeds United
Stein 4'		Charlton 87'

Easter Road, Edinburgh
Attendance: 40,503
Referee: Clive Thomas (Wales)

Leeds won 2–1 on aggregate.

== Quarter-finals ==
Team 1	Agg.	Team 2	1st leg	2nd leg
Dundee FC (Scotland)	2–0	(Switzerland) FC Zürich	1–0	1–0
Rangers FC (Scotland)	0–2	(England) Leeds United	0–0	0–2
Ferencváros (Hungary)	4–2	(Spain) Athletic Bilbao	2–1	2–1
Bologna (Italy)	2–0	(Socialist Federal Republic of Yugoslavia) FK Vojvodina	0–0	2–0

=== First leg ===
27 March 1968

Bologna (Italy)	0–0	(Socialist Federal Republic of Yugoslavia) FK Vojvodina

Bologna

26 March 1968

Rangers FC (Scotland)	0–0	(England) Leeds United

Ibrox Park, Glasgow
Attendance: 85,209
Referee: Gottfried Dienst (Switzerland)

=== Second leg ===
9 April 1968

FK Vojvodina (Socialist Federal Republic of Yugoslavia)	0–2	(Italy) Bologna
		Pace 49'; Clerici 87'

Novi Sad
Referee: Ferdinand Marschall

Bologna won 2–0 on aggregate.

9 April 1968

Leeds United (England)	2–0	(Scotland) Rangers FC
Giles 25'(pen); Lorimer 31'

Elland Road, Leeds
Attendance: 50,498
Referee: Kurt Tschenscher (West Germany)

Leeds won 2–0 on aggregate.

== Semi-finals ==
Team 1	Agg.	Team 2	1st leg	2nd leg
Dundee FC (Scotland)	1–2	(England) Leeds United	1–1	0–1
Ferencváros (Hungary)	5–4	(Italy) Bologna	3–2	2–2

=== First leg ===
22 May 1968

Ferencváros (Hungary)	3–2	(Italy) Bologna
Branikovits 37' 56'; Varga 80'		Clerici 1'; Perani 34'

Budapest

1 May 1968

Dundee FC (Scotland)	1–1	(England) Leeds United
Wilson 36'		Madeley 26'

Dens Park, Dundee
Attendance: 30,000
Referee: Gerhard Schulenberg (West Germany)

=== Second leg ===
27 May 1968

Bologna (Italy)	2–2	(Hungary) Ferencváros
Perani 43'; Tentorio 59'		Varga 24'; Havasi 69'

Bologna

Ferencváros won 5–4 on aggregate.

15 May 1968

Leeds United (England)	1–0	(Scotland) Dundee FC
E Gray 80'

Elland Road, Leeds
Attendance: 23,830
Referee: Willem Scalks (Netherlands)

Leeds won 2–1 on aggregate.

== Final ==
Team 1	Agg.	Team 2	1st leg	2nd leg
Leeds United (England)	1–0	(Hungary) Ferencváros	1–0	0–0

=== First leg ===
7 August 1968

Leeds United (England)	1–0	(Hungary) Ferencváros
Jones 41'

Elland Road, Leeds
Attendance: 25,268
Referee: Rudolph Scheuber (Switzerland)

=== Second leg ===
11 September 1968

Ferencváros (Hungary)	0–0	(England) Leeds United

Népstadion, Budapest
Attendance: 76,000
Referee: Gerhard Schulenberg (West Germany)

Leeds won 1–0 on aggregate.
