= 1968–69 Football League First Division =

1968–69 season of Football League First Division

Football League First Division
- Season: 1968–69
- Champions: Leeds United; 1st English title
- Relegated: Leicester City; Queens Park Rangers
- European Cup: Leeds United
- European Cup Winners' Cup: Manchester City
- Inter-Cities Fairs Cup: Liverpool; Arsenal; Southampton; Newcastle United
- Matches: 462
- Goals: 1,213 (2.63 per match)
- Top goalscorer: Jimmy Greaves (27 goals)

Statistics of Football League First Division in the 1968–69 season.

== Overview ==
Leeds United won the First Division title for the first time in the club's history that season. They wrapped up the title on 28 April 1969, with a 0–0 draw at title challengers Liverpool and finished the season unbeaten at home. Queens Park Rangers went down on 29 March, after losing 2–1 at home to Liverpool. Leicester City joined them after losing 3–2 at Manchester United, where a win would have saved Leicester from relegation at the expense of Coventry City.

== League standings ==
Pos	Team	Pld	W	D	L	GF	GA	GAv	Pts	Qualification or relegation
1	Leeds United (C)	42	27	13	2	66	26	2.538	67	Qualification for the European Cup first round
2	Liverpool	42	25	11	6	63	24	2.625	61	Qualification for the Inter-Cities Fairs Cup first round
3	Everton	42	21	15	6	77	36	2.139	57	
4	Arsenal	42	22	12	8	56	27	2.074	56	Qualification for the Inter-Cities Fairs Cup first round (Note: Everton were ineligible to participate in the Inter-Cities Fairs Cup as Liverpool had already qualified. Under the rules of the cup, only one team per city could participate. Arsenal took their place as the highest-ranked team that had not already qualified for a European competition.)
5	Chelsea	42	20	10	12	73	53	1.377	50	
6	Tottenham Hotspur	42	14	17	11	61	51	1.196	45	
7	Southampton	42	16	13	13	57	48	1.188	45	Qualification for the Inter-Cities Fairs Cup first round (Note: Chelsea and Tottenham Hotspur were ineligible to participate in the Inter-Cities Fairs Cup as Arsenal had already qualified. Under the rules of the cup, only one team per city could participate. Southampton took their place as the highest-ranked team that had not already qualified for a European competition.)
8	West Ham United	42	13	18	11	66	50	1.320	44	
9	Newcastle United	42	15	14	13	61	55	1.109	44	Qualification for the Inter-Cities Fairs Cup first round (Note: Newcastle United qualified for the Inter-Cities Fairs Cup as the 1968-69 Inter-Cities Fairs Cup winners)
10	West Bromwich Albion	42	16	11	15	64	67	0.955	43	
11	Manchester United	42	15	12	15	57	53	1.075	42	
12	Ipswich Town	42	15	11	16	59	60	0.983	41	
13	Manchester City	42	15	10	17	64	55	1.164	40	Qualification for the European Cup Winners' Cup first round (Note: Manchester City qualified for the European Cup Winners' Cup as the 1968-69 FA Cup winners.)
14	Burnley	42	15	9	18	55	82	0.671	39	
15	Sheffield Wednesday	42	10	16	16	41	54	0.759	36	
16	Wolverhampton Wanderers	42	10	15	17	41	58	0.707	35	
17	Sunderland	42	11	12	19	43	67	0.642	34	
18	Nottingham Forest	42	10	13	19	45	57	0.789	33	
19	Stoke City	42	9	15	18	40	63	0.635	33	
20	Coventry City	42	10	11	21	46	64	0.719	31	
21	Leicester City (R)	42	9	12	21	39	68	0.574	30	Relegation to the Second Division
22	Queens Park Rangers (R)	42	4	10	28	39	95	0.411	18	Relegation to the Second Division

Source: World Football
Rules for classification: 1) Points; 2) Goal average; 3) Goals scored
(C) Champions; (R) Relegated

== Results ==
Home \ Away	ARS	BUR	CHE	COV	EVE	IPS	LEE	LEI	LIV	MCI	MUN	NEW	NOT	QPR	SHW	SOU	STK	SUN	TOT	WBA	WHU	WOL
Arsenal		2–0	0–1	2–1	3–1	0–2	1–2	3–0	1–1	4–1	3–0	0–0	1–1	2–1	2–0	0–0	1–0	0–0	1–0	2–0	0–0	3–1
Burnley	0–1		2–1	1–1	1–2	1–0	5–1	2–1	0–4	2–1	1–0	1–0	3–1	2–2	2–0	3–1	1–1	1–2	2–2	2–2	3–1	1–1
Chelsea	2–1	2–3		2–1	1–1	3–1	1–1	3–0	1–2	2–0	3–2	1–1	1–1	2–1	1–0	2–3	1–0	5–1	2–2	3–1	1–1	1–1
Coventry City	0–1	4–1	0–1		2–2	0–2	0–1	1–0	0–0	1–1	2–1	2–1	1–1	5–0	3–0	1–1	1–1	3–1	1–2	4–2	1–2	0–1
Everton	1–0	3–0	1–2	3–0		2–2	0–0	7–1	0–0	2–0	0–0	1–1	2–1	4–0	3–0	1–0	2–1	2–0	0–2	4–0	1–0	4–0
Ipswich Town	1–2	2–0	1–3	0–0	2–2		2–3	2–1	0–2	2–1	1–0	1–4	2–3	3–0	2–0	0–0	3–1	1–0	0–1	4–1	2–2	1–0
Leeds United	2–0	6–1	1–0	3–0	2–1	2–0		2–0	1–0	1–0	2–1	2–1	1–0	4–1	2–0	3–2	2–0	1–1	0–0	0–0	2–0	2–1
Leicester City	0–0	0–2	1–4	1–1	1–1	1–3	1–1		1–2	3–0	2–1	2–1	2–2	2–0	1–1	3–1	0–0	2–1	1–0	0–2	1–1	2–0
Liverpool	1–1	1–1	2–1	2–0	1–1	4–0	0–0	4–0		2–1	2–0	2–1	0–2	2–0	1–0	1–0	2–1	4–1	1–0	1–0	2–0	1–0
Manchester City	1–1	7–0	4–1	4–2	1–3	1–1	3–1	2–0	1–0		0–0	1–0	3–3	3–1	0–1	1–1	3–1	1–0	4–0	5–1	1–1	3–2
Manchester United	0–0	2–0	0–4	1–0	2–1	0–0	0–0	3–2	1–0	0–1		3–1	3–1	8–1	1–0	1–2	1–1	4–1	3–1	2–1	1–1	2–0
Newcastle United	2–1	1–0	3–2	2–0	0–0	2–1	0–1	0–0	1–1	1–0	2–0		1–1	3–2	3–2	4–1	5–0	1–1	2–2	2–3	1–1	4–1
Nottingham Forest	0–2	2–2	1–2	0–0	1–0	1–2	0–2	0–0	0–1	1–0	0–1	2–4		1–0	0–0	1–0	3–3	1–0	0–2	3–0	0–1	0–0
Queens Park Rangers	0–1	0–2	0–4	0–1	0–1	2–1	0–1	1–1	1–2	1–1	2–3	1–1	2–1		3–2	1–1	2–1	2–2	1–1	0–4	1–1	0–1
Sheffield Wednesday	0–5	1–0	1–1	3–0	2–2	2–1	0–0	1–3	1–2	1–1	5–4	1–1	0–1	4–0		0–0	2–1	1–1	0–0	1–0	1–1	0–2
Southampton	1–2	5–1	5–0	1–0	2–5	2–2	1–3	1–0	2–0	3–0	2–0	0–0	1–1	3–2	1–1		2–0	1–0	2–1	2–0	2–2	2–1
Stoke City	1–3	1–3	2–0	0–3	0–0	2–1	1–5	1–0	0–0	1–0	0–0	1–0	3–1	1–1	1–1	1–0		2–1	1–1	1–1	0–2	4–1
Sunderland	0–0	2–0	3–2	3–0	1–3	3–0	0–1	2–0	0–2	0–4	1–1	1–1	3–1	0–0	0–0	1–0	4–1		0–0	0–1	2–1	2–0
Tottenham Hotspur	1–2	7–0	1–0	2–0	1–1	2–2	0–0	3–2	2–1	1–1	2–2	0–1	2–1	3–2	1–2	2–1	1–1	5–1		1–1	1–0	1–1
West Bromwich Albion	1–0	3–2	0–3	6–1	1–1	2–2	1–1	1–1	0–0	2–0	3–1	5–1	2–5	3–1	0–0	1–2	2–1	3–0	4–3		3–1	0–0
West Ham United	1–2	5–0	0–0	5–2	1–4	1–3	1–1	4–0	1–1	2–1	0–0	3–1	1–0	4–3	1–1	0–0	0–0	8–0	2–2	4–0		3–1
Wolverhampton Wanderers	0–0	1–1	1–1	1–1	1–2	1–1	0–0	1–0	0–6	3–1	2–2	5–0	1–0	3–1	0–3	0–0	1–1	1–1	2–0	0–1	2–0	

Updated to match(es) played on unknown. Source: Ian Laschke: Rothmans Book of Football League Records 1888–89 to 1978–79. Macdonald and Jane’s, London & Sydney, 1980.
Legend: Blue = home team win; Yellow = draw; Red = away team win.

== Managerial changes ==
Team	Outgoing manager	Manner of departure	Date of vacancy	Position in table	Incoming manager	Date of appointment
Queens Park Rangers	(England) Alec Stock	Illness	1 August 1968	Pre-season	(England) Bill Dodgin Jr.	1 August 1968
Queens Park Rangers	(England) Bill Dodgin Jr.	Demoted to coach	2 November 1968	22nd	(Scotland) Tommy Docherty	2 November 1968
Wolverhampton Wanderers	(England) Ronnie Allen	Sacked	17 November 1968	14th	(England) Bill McGarry	23 November 1968
Ipswich Town	(England) Bill McGarry	Signed by Wolverhampton Wanderers	23 November 1968	17th	(Wales) Cyril Lea (caretaker)	23 November 1968
Queens Park Rangers	(Scotland) Tommy Docherty	Resigned	30 November 1968	22nd	(England) Les Allen	1 December 1968
Nottingham Forest	(Republic of Ireland) Johnny Carey	Sacked	30 December 1968	19th	(Scotland) Matt Gillies	2 January 1969
Leicester City	(Scotland) Matt Gillies	Signed by Nottingham Forest	2 January 1969	20th	(Republic of Ireland) Frank O'Farrell	5 January 1969
Ipswich Town	(Wales) Cyril Lea	End of caretaker spell	13 January 1969	18th	(England) Bobby Robson	13 January 1969
Sheffield Wednesday	(England) Jack Marshall	Sacked	2 April 1969	13th	(Scotland) Tom McAnearney (caretaker)	2 April 1969

== Top scorers ==
Rank	Player	Club	Goals
1	(England) Jimmy Greaves	Tottenham Hotspur	27
2	(England) Geoff Hurst	West Ham United	25
3	(England) Joe Royle	Everton	22
4	(England) Pop Robson	Newcastle United	21
=	(England) Jeff Astle	West Bromwich Albion	21
5	(Wales) Ron Davies	Southampton	20
