= 1977–78 Leeds United A.F.C. season =

1977–1978 season of Leeds United

Leeds United
1977–78 season
- Chairman: Manny Cussins
- Manager: Jimmy Armfield
- Stadium: Elland Road
- First Division: 9th
- FA Cup: Third round
- Football League Cup: Semi-final
- Top goalscorer: League: Ray Hankin (20); All: Ray Hankin (21)
- Highest home attendance: 45,560 vs Everton (27 December 1977, First Division)
- Lowest home attendance: 16,531 vs Derby County (12 April 1978, First Division)
- Average home league attendance: 31,178
- Biggest win: 5–0 vs Middlesbrough (18 March 1978)
- Biggest defeat: 0–3 vs Norwich City (1 April 1978)

The 1977–78 season was Leeds United's fourteenth consecutive season in the Football League First Division.

== Background ==
Following the 1973–74 season, Don Revie left his position as Leeds manager to manage the England national team, and his successor Brian Clough, who was an outspoken critic of Revie and the team's tactics, lasted just 44 days as manager. Clough was replaced by former England captain Jimmy Armfield. Armfield took Revie's ageing team to the final of the 1974–75 European Cup, in which they were defeated by Bayern Munich under controversial circumstances. Assisted by coach Don Howe, Armfield rebuilt Revie's team, and though it no longer dominated English football, Leeds finished 5th in the 1975–76 season and 10th in 1976–77.

== Season summary ==
1977-78 proved to be another decent, but unexceptional season, with the highlight being a run to the semi-finals of the Football League Cup, albeit it ended in a 7-3 aggregate loss to eventual Division One champions Nottingham Forest. Leeds's league form was for the most part better than in the previous season, keeping them in the hunt for a UEFA Cup space until the latter stages of the campaign, but a poor end saw them finish in ninth place after winning just one of their last seven games. This caused the club's board to run out of patience with manager Jimmy Armfield, who was dismissed weeks after the season ended and replaced, after an unsuccessful attempt to recruit Southampton manager Lawrie McMenemy, by former Celtic manager Jock Stein.

== Competitions ==
=== Football League First Division ===
==== League table ====
Pos	Team	Pld	W	D	L	GF	GA	GD	Pts
7	Coventry City	42	18	12	12	75	62	+13	48
8	Aston Villa	42	18	10	14	57	42	+15	46
9	Leeds United	42	18	10	14	63	53	+10	46
10	Manchester United	42	16	10	16	67	63	+4	42
11	Birmingham City	42	16	9	17	55	60	−5	41

Source: World Football
Rules for classification: 1) Points; 2) Goal difference; 3) Goals scored

==== Matches ====
Win	Draw	Loss

First Division match results
Date	Opponent	Venue	Result F–A	Scorers	Attendance
20 August 1977	Newcastle United	Away	2–3	Hankin, Lorimer	36,491
24 August 1977	West Bromwich Albion	Home	2–2	Jordan, McQueen	21,000
27 August 1977	Birmingham City	Home	1–0	Hankin	24,551
3 September 1977	Coventry City	Away	2–2	Hankin, McQueen	21,479
10 September 1977	Ipswich Town	Home	2–1	Hankin (2)	24,280
17 September 1977	Derby County	Away	2–2	Lorimer, Graham	24,274
24 September 1977	Manchester United	Home	1–1	Hankin	33,514
1 October 1977	Chelsea	Away	2–1	Lorimer, Hankin	35,427
5 October 1977	Aston Villa	Home	1–1	McQueen	27,797
8 October 1977	Bristol City	Away	2–3	Hankin (2)	26,215
15 October 1977	Liverpool	Home	1–2	Thomas	45,500
22 October 1977	Middlesbrough	Away	1–2	Harris	27,516
October 29, 1977	Leicester City	Away	0–0	—	20,128
5 November 1977	Norwich City	Home	2–2	Lorimer (2)	24,345
12 November 1977	Manchester City	Away	3–2	Jordan, Graham, Hankin	42,651
19 November 1977	Nottingham Forest	Home	1–0	Hankin	42,925
26 November 1977	West Ham United	Away	1–0	Hankin	26,883
3 December 1977	Queens Park Rangers	Home	3–0	Needham (og), Flynn, Currie	26,597
10 December 1977	Arsenal	Away	1–1	McQueen	40,162
17 December 1977	Manchester City	Home	2–0	McQueen, Cherry	37,380
26 December 1977	Wolverhampton Wanderers	Away	1–3	Jordan	27,704
27 December 1977	Everton	Home	3–1	Hankin (2), Lorimer	45,560
31 December 1977	West Bromwich Albion	Away	0–2	—	24,249
2 January 1978	Newcastle United	Home	0–2	—	36,643
14 January 1978	Birmingham City	Away	3–2	Graham (3)	23,703
21 January 1978	Coventry City	Home	2–0	Hankin, Harris	27,062
4 February 1978	Ipswich Town	Away	1–0	E. Gray	24,023
25 February 1978	Chelsea	Home	2–0	F. Gray, Currie	25,263
1 March 1978	Manchester United	Away	1–0	Clarke	49,101
4 March 1978	Bristol City	Home	0–2	—	24,830
11 March 1978	Liverpool	Away	0–1	—	48,233
18 March 1978	Middlesbrough	Home	5–0	Hankin, Graham (2), Clarke (2)	25,158
25 March 1978	Everton	Away	0–2	—	45,020
27 March 1978	Wolverhampton Wanderers	Home	2–1	Graham, Hankin	24,440
28 March 1978	Leicester City	Home	5–1	Hankin, F. Gray, E. Gray (3)	21,145
1 April 1978	Norwich City	Away	0–3	—	19,615
8 April 1978	West Ham United	Home	1–2	Graham	22,953
12 April 1978	Derby County	Home	2–0	E. Gray, Hankin	16,531
15 April 1978	Nottingham Forest	Away	1–1	F. Gray	38,662
22 April 1978	Arsenal	Home	1–3	Currie	33,263
26 April 1978	Aston Villa	Away	1–3	Hankin	30,524
29 April 1978	Queens Park Rangers	Away	0–0	—	23,993

=== FA Cup ===
Win	Draw	Loss

FA Cup match results
Round	Date	Opponent	Venue	Result F–A	Scorers	Attendance
7 January 1978	Third round	Manchester City	Home	1–2	F. Gray	38,517

=== Football League Cup ===
Win	Draw	Loss

Football League Cup match results
Round	Date	Opponent	Venue	Result F–A	Scorers	Attendance
Second round	31 August 1977	Rochdale	Away	3–0	Jordan, Cherry, Harris	8,644
Third round	26 October 1977	Colchester United	Home	4–0	Jordan, Graham, Lorimer, Hankin	17,713
Fourth round	30 November 1977	Bolton Wanderers	Away	3–1	Graham, Jordan, F. Gray	33,766
Fifth round	18 January 1978	Everton	Home	4–1	Currie, Lorimer (2), E. Gray	35,020
Semi-final - First leg	8 February 1978	Nottingham Forest	Home	1–3	E. Gray	43,222
Semi-final - Second leg	22 February 1978	Nottingham Forest	Away	2–4	F. Gray, Graham	38,131

== Statistics ==
=== Appearances and goals ===
Players having played at least one first-team match
Pos.	Nat.	Name	First Division		FA Cup		League Cup		Total	
Pos.	Nat.	Name	Apps	Goals	Apps	Goals	Apps	Goals	Apps	Goals
GK	SCO	David Stewart	17	0	0	0	2	0	19	0
DF	ENG	Paul Reaney	15	0	1	0	5	0	21	0
DF	ENG	Trevor Cherry	41	1	1	0	6	1	48	2
FW	SCO	Peter Lorimer	28	6	0	0	4	3	32	9
DF	SCO	Gordon McQueen	21	5	1	0	1	0	23	5
DF	ENG	Paul Madeley	38	0	1	0	6	0	45	0
MF	SCO	Eddie Gray	27	5	0	0	4	2	31	7
FW	SCO	David McNiven	2	0	0	0	0	0	2	0
FW	ENG	Ray Hankin	33	20	1	0	6	1	40	21
MF	ENG	Tony Currie	35	3	1	0	5	1	41	4
MF	SCO	Arthur Graham	40	9	1	0	6	3	47	12
DF	SCO	Frank Gray	41	3	1	1	6	2	48	6
FW	SCO	Joe Jordan	20	3	0	0	3	3	23	6
MF	WAL	Carl Harris	19	2	1	0	4	1	24	3
MF	WAL	Byron Stevenson	5	0	0	0	0	0	5	0
MF	WAL	Gwyn Thomas	3	1	0	0	0	0	3	1
DF	ENG	Keith Parkinson	8	0	0	0	4	0	12	0
GK	SCO	David Harvey	25	0	1	0	4	0	30	0
MF	WAL	Brian Flynn	29	1	1	0	0	0	30	1
DF	ENG	Peter Hampton	11	0	0	0	2	0	13	0
FW	ENG	Allan Clarke	9	3	1	0	1	0	11	3
DF	ENG	Neil Parker	1	0	0	0	0	0	1	0
DF	ENG	Paul Hart	12	0	0	0	0	0	2	0
