= 1974–75 Leeds United A.F.C. season =

1974–75 season of Leeds United

Leeds United
1974–75 season
- Chairman: Manny Cussins
- Manager: Brian Clough (until 12 September 1974); Maurice Lindley (caretaker); Jimmy Armfield (from 4 October 1974)
- Stadium: Elland Road
- First Division: 9th
- FA Cup: Quarter-finals
- League Cup: Fourth round
- European Cup: Runners-up
- Charity Shield: Runners-up
- Top goalscorer: League: Allan Clarke (14); All: Allan Clarke (22)
- Highest home attendance: 50,393 vs Barcelona (9 April 1975, European Cup)
- Lowest home attendance: 14,599 vs Huddersfield Town (7 October 1974, League Cup)
- Average home league attendance: 34,496
Home colours	Away colours

The 1974–75 season saw Leeds United compete in the Football League First Division. As reigning English champions, they also competed in the European Cup.

== Season summary ==
Manager Don Revie left after many successful years at Leeds to manage the England side. He was replaced by Brighton & Hove Albion's Brian Clough—this appointment raised many eyebrows, as Clough had often made public his disdain for both Revie and the playing style of his Leeds side, even clamouring for the club to be relegated on disciplinary grounds.

As it turned out, Clough only lasted 44 days at Elland Road. He alienated several key players like Johnny Giles, Norman Hunter and Billy Bremner and reportedly, in his first training session, told the players to "throw [their] medals in the bin because they were not won fairly." After a poor start which saw Leeds in 19th place after one win from the opening six games and only 4 points from a possible 12 won, the Leeds directors sacked Clough.

Replacing Clough was Bolton Wanderers' Jimmy Armfield. Armfield, while unable to turn the club's fortunes around to finish higher than ninth, bought the Yorkshire club better success in the European Cup, with the club reaching the final against Bayern Munich in Paris. The German side won 2–0 in controversial circumstances, with two goals in 10 minutes late in the second half, but Leeds could have won the match, having denied two strong penalty appeals for fouls by Bayern's Franz Beckenbauer. Indeed, Leeds did get a goal in the 63rd minute, through Peter Lorimer, but Beckenbauer successfully convinced referee Michel Kitabdjian to consult with the linesman, who had not raised his flag; Kitabdijan subsequently indicated Lorimer was marginally offside. This decision to not allow the goal caused riots to break out amongst the travelling Leeds fans.

The violence during the riots saw Leeds banned from European competition for four years (later reduced to two on appeal); but, as Leeds would not qualify for European competition again until 1979, the ban was never applied.

Nonetheless, bitterness remains amongst the Leeds fans even today, due to their perception of being cheated of victory and the European Cup. Over 50 years on, Leeds fans can still be heard chanting at away matches "We are the champions, champions of Europe".

== Squad ==
Note: Flags indicate national team as defined under FIFA eligibility rules; some limited exceptions apply. Players may hold more than one non-FIFA nationality.

Pos.	Nation	Player
GK	WAL	Glan Letheren
GK	SCO	David Harvey
GK	SCO	David Stewart
DF	ENG	Trevor Cherry
DF	ENG	Peter Hampton
DF	ENG	Norman Hunter
DF	ENG	Paul Madeley
DF	ENG	Paul Reaney
DF	WAL	Byron Stevenson
DF	SCO	Frank Gray
DF	SCO	Gordon McQueen
MF	ENG	Mick Bates

Pos.	Nation	Player
MF	WAL	Carl Harris
MF	WAL	Gwyn Thomas
MF	WAL	Terry Yorath
MF	SCO	Billy Bremner (captain)
MF	SCO	Eddie Gray
MF	SCO	Peter Lorimer
MF	IRL	Johnny Giles
FW	ENG	Allan Clarke
FW	ENG	Mick Jones
FW	ENG	Duncan McKenzie
FW	SCO	Joe Jordan
FW	SCO	Gary Liddell

=== Left club during season ===
Note: Flags indicate national team as defined under FIFA eligibility rules; some limited exceptions apply. Players may hold more than one non-FIFA nationality.

Pos.	Nation	Player
MF	SCO	John McGovern (to Nottingham Forest)
FW	SCO	John O'Hare (to Nottingham Forest)

Pos.	Nation	Player
DF	ENG	Terry Cooper (to Middlesbrough)

=== Transfers ===
In
Pos.	Name	from	Type
FW	Duncan McKenzie	Nottingham Forest	£250,000
MF	John McGovern	Derby County	£75,000
FW	John O'Hare	Derby County	£50,000

Out
Pos.	Name	To	Type
DF	Roy Ellam	Huddersfield Town	
DF	Nigel Davey	Rotherham United	
MF	Jimmy Mann	Bristol City	

==== Winter ====
In
Pos.	Name	from	Type

Out
Pos.	Name	To	Type
MF	John McGovern	Nottingham Forest	
FW	John O'Hare	Nottingham Forest	
DF	Terry Cooper	Middlesbrough	

== Competitions ==
=== First Division ===
==== Table ====
Pos	Team	Pld	W	D	L	GF	GA	GAv	Pts
7	Middlesbrough	42	18	12	12	54	40	1.350	48
8	Manchester City	42	18	10	14	54	54	1.000	46
9	Leeds United	42	16	13	13	57	49	1.163	45
10	Burnley	42	17	11	14	68	67	1.015	45
11	Queens Park Rangers	42	16	10	16	54	54	1.000	42

Source: World Football
Rules for classification: 1) Points; 2) Goal average; 3) Goals scored

==== Results ====
Win	Draw	Loss

First Division match details
Date	Opponent	Venue	Result F–A	Scorers	Attendance
17 August 1974	Stoke City	Away	0–3	—	33,534
21 August 1974	Queens Park Rangers	Home	0–1	—	31,497
24 August 1974	Birmingham City	Home	1–0	Clarke	30,820
27 August 1974	Queens Park Rangers	Away	1–1	Yorath	24,965
31 August 1974	Manchester City	Away	1–2	Clarke	37,919
7 September 1974	Luton Town	Home	1–1	Clarke	26,450
14 September 1974	Burnley	Away	1–2	Lorimer	25,122
21 September 1974	Sheffield United	Home	5–1	Clarke (2), McQueen, Lorimer pen., Yorath	33,382
28 September 1974	Everton	Away	2–3	Clarke, Yorath	41,824
5 October 1974	Arsenal	Home	2–0	McKenzie (2)	32,784
12 October 1974	Ipswich Town	Away	0–0	—	29,815
15 October 1974	Birmingham City	Away	0–1	—	36,513
19 October 1974	Wolverhampton Wanderers	Home	2–0	Clarke, McKenzie	31,224
26 October 1974	Liverpool	Away	0–1	—	54,996
2 November 1974	Derby County	Home	0–1	—	33,551
9 November 1974	Coventry City	Away	3–0	O'Hare, Hindley o.g., Bremner	25,414
16 November 1974	Middlesbrough	Home	2–2	McKenzie (2)	45,488
23 November 1974	Carlisle United	Away	2–1	Jordan, McKenzie	19,975
30 November 1974	Chelsea	Home	2–0	Cherry, Clarke	30,441
4 December 1974	Tottenham Hotspur	Home	2–1	McKenzie, Lorimer pen.	25,832
7 December 1974	West Ham United	Away	1–2	McKenzie	39,562
14 December 1974	Stoke City	Home	3–1	McQueen, Lorimer, Yorath	34,685
21 December 1974	Newcastle United	Away	0–3	—	32,535
26 December 1974	Burnley	Home	2–2	Jordan, Lorimer	34,724
28 December 1974	Leicester City	Away	2–0	F. Gray, McKenzie	29,699
11 January 1975	West Ham United	Home	2–1	Clarke, McKenzie	40,099
18 January 1975	Chelsea	Away	2–0	McKenzie, Yorath	34,733
1 February 1975	Coventry City	Home	0–0	—	33,901
8 February 1975	Derby County	Away	0–0	—	33,641
22 February 1975	Middlesbrough	Away	1–0	Clarke	39,500
25 February 1975	Carlisle United	Home	3–1	Lorimer, Clarke, E. Gray	32,346
1 March 1975	Manchester City	Home	2–2	Lorimer (2)	47,489
15 March 1975	Everton	Home	0–0	—	50,084
22 March 1975	Luton Town	Away	1–2	Jordan	23,048
29 March 1975	Newcastle United	Home	1–1	Clarke	40,994
31 March 1975	Leicester City	Home	2–2	Clarke, Giles	29,898
1 April 1975	Sheffield United	Away	1–1	Madeley	38,442
5 April 1975	Liverpool	Home	0–2	—	34,971
12 April 1975	Arsenal	Away	2–1	Clarke, Hunter	36,619
19 April 1975	Ipswich Town	Home	2–1	Cherry, Harris	30,174
26 April 1975	Wolverhampton Wanderers	Away	1–1	F. Gray	34,875
28 April 1975	Tottenham Hotspur	Away	2–4	Jordan, Lorimer	49,886

=== FA Charity Shield ===
10 August 1974
15:00

Liverpool	1–1	Leeds United
Boersma 19'		Cherry 70'
Penalties
Lindsay (penalty scored); Hughes (penalty scored); Hall (penalty scored); Smith (penalty scored); Cormack (penalty scored); Callaghan (penalty scored)	6–5	(penalty scored) Lorimer; (penalty scored) Giles; (penalty scored) Gray; (penalty scored) Hunter; (penalty scored) Cherry; (penalty missed) Harvey

Wembley Stadium, London
Attendance: 67,000
Referee: Bob Matthewson

Liverpool	Leeds United

GK	1	(England) Ray Clemence
RB	2	(England) Tommy Smith	Booked
LB	3	(England) Alec Lindsay
CB	4	(England) Phil Thompson
CM	5	(Scotland) Peter Cormack
CB	6	(England) Emlyn Hughes (c)
CF	7	(England) Kevin Keegan	(red card) 60'
CM	8	(Scotland) Brian Hall
LM	9	(Republic of Ireland) Steve Heighway
RM	11	(England) Ian Callaghan
CF	12	(England) Phil Boersma
Substitutes:
DF	13	(England) Brian Kettle
MF	14	(England) John McLaughlin
DF	15	(England) Max Thompson
MF	16	(England) Peter Spiring
GK	17	(England) Peter McDonnell
Manager:
(England) Bob Paisley

GK	1	(Scotland) David Harvey
RB	2	(England) Paul Reaney
LB	3	(England) Trevor Cherry
CM	4	(Scotland) Billy Bremner (c)	(red card) 60'
CB	5	(Scotland) Gordon McQueen
CB	6	(England) Norman Hunter
CM	7	(Scotland) Peter Lorimer
CF	8	(England) Allan Clarke	(substituted off) 58'
CF	9	(Scotland) Joe Jordan
RM	10	(Republic of Ireland) Johnny Giles	Booked
LM	12	(Scotland) Eddie Gray
Substitutes:
MF	15	(England) Duncan McKenzie	(substituted on) 58'
Manager:
(England) Brian Clough

=== FA Cup ===
Win	Draw	Loss

FA Cup match details
Round	Date	Opponent	Venue	Result F–A	Scorers	Attendance
Third round	4 January 1975	Cardiff City	Home	4–1	E. Gray, Clarke (2), McKenzie	31,572
Fourth round	24 January 1975	Wimbledon	Home	0–0	—	46,230
Fourth round replay	10 February 1975	Wimbledon	Away (Note: Match played at Selhurst Park)	1–0	Bassett o.g.	45,071
Fifth round	18 February 1975	Derby County	Away	1–0	Nish o.g.	35,298
Sixth round	8 March 1975	Ipswich Town	Away	0–0	—	38,010
Sixth round replay	11 March 1975	Ipswich Town	Home	1–1 (a.e.t.)	McKenzie 90'	50,074
Sixth round second replay	25 March 1975	Ipswich Town	Neutral	0–0 (a.e.t.)	—	35,195
Sixth round third replay	27 March 1975	Ipswich Town	Neutral	2–3	Clarke, Giles	19,510

=== League Cup ===
Win	Draw	Loss

League Cup match details
Round	Date	Opponent	Venue	Result F–A	Scorers	Attendance
Second round	10 September 1974	Huddersfield Town	Away	1–1	Lorimer	15,013
Second round replay	24 September 1974	Huddersfield Town	Home	1–1 (a.e.t.)	Clarke	18,496
Second round second replay	7 October 1974	Huddersfield Town	Home	2–1	Bates, Lorimer	14,599
Third round	9 October 1974	Bury	Away	2–1	Lorimer, Cherry	16,354
Fourth round	13 November 1974	Chester	Away	0–3	—	19,000

=== European Cup ===
Win	Draw	Loss

European Cup match details
Round	Date	Opponent	Venue	Result F–A	Scorers	Attendance
First round, first leg	28 September 1974	FC Zürich	Home	4–1	Clarke (2), Lorimer pen., Jordan	20,012
First round, second leg	2 October 1974	FC Zürich	Away	1–2	Clarke	16,500
Second round, first leg	23 October 1974	Újpest	Away	2–1	Lorimer, McQueen	20,000
Second round, second leg	6 November 1974	Újpest	Home	3–0	McQueen, Bremner, Yorath	28,091
Third round, first leg	5 March 1975	Anderlecht	Home	3–0	Jordan, McQueen, Lorimer	43,195
Third round, second leg	19 March 1975	Anderlecht	Away	1–0	Bremner	37,000
Semi-final, first leg	9 April 1975	Barcelona	Home	2–1	Bremner, Clarke	50,393
Semi-final, second leg	24 April 1975	Barcelona	Away	1–1	Lorimer	110,000
Final	28 May 1975	Bayern Munich	Neutral	0–2	—	48,374

==== Final ====
28 May 1975
19:15 CET

Bayern Munich (West Germany)	2–0	(England) Leeds United
Roth 71'; Müller 81'	Report

Parc des Princes, Paris
Attendance: 48,374
Referee: Michel Kitabdjian (France)

Bayern Munich	Leeds United

GK	1	(West Germany) Sepp Maier
RB	2	(West Germany) Bernd Dürnberger
CB	4	(West Germany) Hans-Georg Schwarzenbeck	(yellow card) 20'
CB	5	(West Germany) Franz Beckenbauer (c)
LB	3	(Sweden) Björn Andersson		(substituted off) 4'
RM	8	(West Germany) Rainer Zobel
CM	7	(Sweden) Conny Torstensson
LM	6	(West Germany) Franz Roth
RF	10	(West Germany) Uli Hoeneß		(substituted off) 42'
CF	9	(West Germany) Gerd Müller
LF	11	(West Germany) Jupp Kapellmann
Substitutes:
FW	12	(West Germany) Klaus Wunder		(substituted on) 42'
MF	13	(West Germany) Sepp Weiß		(substituted on) 4'
FW	14	(West Germany) Karl-Heinz Rummenigge
DF	15	(West Germany) Bernd Förster
GK	16	(West Germany) Hugo Robl
Manager:
(West Germany) Dettmar Cramer

GK	1	(Scotland) David Stewart
RB	2	(England) Paul Reaney	(yellow card) 7'
CB	6	(England) Norman Hunter	(yellow card) 83'
CB	5	(England) Paul Madeley
LB	3	(Scotland) Frank Gray
RM	7	(Scotland) Peter Lorimer
CM	4	(Scotland) Billy Bremner (c)
CM	10	(Republic of Ireland) Johnny Giles
LM	11	(Wales) Terry Yorath		(substituted off) 80'
CF	8	(England) Allan Clarke
CF	9	(Scotland) Joe Jordan
Substitutes:
GK	12	(Wales) Glan Letheren
DF	13	(England) Trevor Cherry
DF	14	(England) Peter Hampton
MF	15	(Scotland) Eddie Gray		(substituted on) 80'
FW	16	(England) Duncan McKenzie
Manager:
(England) Jimmy Armfield

== Awards ==
At the end of the season, defender Gordon McQueen was named the club's Player of the Year.
