= 1976–77 Leeds United A.F.C. season =

1976–77 season of Leeds United

Leeds United
1976–77 season
- Chairman: Manny Cussins
- Manager: Jimmy Armfield
- Stadium: Elland Road
- First Division: 10th
- FA Cup: Semi-finals
- League Cup: Second round
- Top goalscorer: League: Joe Jordan (10); All: Joe Jordan (12)
- Highest home attendance: 48,708 vs Manchester City (27 December 1976, First Division)
- Lowest home attendance: 16,891 vs West Ham United (26 April 1977, First Division)
- Average home league attendance: 31,176

The 1976–77 season was Leeds United's thirteenth consecutive season in the Football League First Division.

== Season summary ==
Leeds United's league form was inconsistent and they could only muster fifteen league wins all season. Their start was poor with one win in their first nine games. They recovered a little through the autumn but continued to struggle for goals. Leeds though faded away and finished in 10th, their lowest finish since 1964.

On a more positive note, Leeds went on a brilliant FA Cup run they beat Norwich City, Birmingham City, Manchester City and Wolves to reach the semi-finals, where they were drawn with Manchester United. They conceded two early goals at Hillsborough and even after Allan Clarke pulled a goal back, Leeds could not recover.

There was an inconsolable feeling about the club as the season drew to a close. The crowd of 16,891 who watched Leeds draw 1–1 with West Ham United on 26 April at Elland Road was the lowest since the club's return to the First Division, bearing testimony to the depression felt by the Leeds fans.

== Competitions ==
=== Football League First Division ===
==== League table ====
Pos	Team	Pld	W	D	L	GF	GA	GD	Pts
8	Arsenal	42	16	11	15	64	59	+5	43
9	Everton	42	14	14	14	62	64	−2	42
10	Leeds United	42	15	12	15	48	51	−3	42
11	Leicester City	42	12	18	12	47	60	−13	42
12	Middlesbrough	42	14	13	15	40	45	−5	41

Source: World Football
Rules for classification: 1) Points; 2) Goal difference; 3) Goals scored

==== Matches ====
Win	Draw	Loss

Date	Opponent	Venue	Result (Note: Leeds United's score written first)	Scorers	Attendance
21 August 1976	West Bromwich Albion	Home	2–2	Clarke, Harris	40,248
24 August 1976	Birmingham City	Away	0–0	—	35,399
28 August 1976	Coventry City	Away	2–4	Currie, F. Gray	18,227
4 September 1976	Derby County	Home	2–0	Cherry, E. Gray	33,352
11 September 1976	Tottenham Hotspur	Away	0–1	—	35,525
18 September 1976	Newcastle United	Home	2–2	Harris, McNiven	35,089
25 September 1976	Middlesbrough	Away	0–1	—	25,000
2 October 1976	Manchester United	Home	0–2	—	44,512
6 October 1976	West Ham United	Away	3–1	Harris, Lorimer, E. Gray	21,909
16 October 1976	Norwich City	Away	2–1	E. Gray, F. Gray	25,217
23 October 1976	Liverpool	Home	1–1	McNiven	44,696
30 October 1976	Arsenal	Home	2–1	Cherry, Jordan	33,566
6 November 1976	Everton	Away	2–0	Jordan, McQueen	32,618
10 November 1976	Stoke City	Home	1–1	Lorimer	29,199
20 November 1976	Ipswich Town	Away	1–1	McQueen	30,096
27 November 1976	Leicester City	Home	2–2	Lorimer, McNiven	29,713
11 December 1976	Aston Villa	Home	1–3	McNiven	31,232
27 December 1976	Manchester City	Home	0–2	—	48,708
29 December 1976	Sunderland	Away	1–0	Jordan	26,999
3 January 1977	Arsenal	Away	1–1	Clarke	44,090
22 January 1977	West Bromwich Albion	Away	2–1	McQueen, E. Gray	25,958
2 February 1977	Birmingham City	Home	1–0	McQueen	22,805
5 February 1977	Coventry City	Home	1–2	Jordan	26,058
12 February 1977	Derby County	Away	1–0	Jordan	28,350
19 February 1977	Tottenham Hotspur	Home	2–0	Clarke, Jordan	16,201
2 March 1977	Newcastle United	Away	0–3	—	31,995
5 March 1977	Middlesbrough	Home	2–1	McQueen (2)	32,152
8 March 1977	Queens Park Rangers	Away	0–0	—	20,386
12 March 1977	Manchester United	Away	0–1	—	60,612
23 March 1977	Norwich City	Home	3–2	Jordan, Reaney, Hampton	18,700
2 April 1977	Liverpool	Away	1–3	McQueen	48,791
8 April 1977	Manchester City	Away	1–2	Jordan	47,727
9 April 1977	Sunderland	Home	1–1	Cherry	32,966
12 April 1977	Stoke City	Away	1–2	Jordan	17,960
16 April 1977	Ipswich Town	Home	2–1	McGhie, Clarke (pen)	28,578
26 April 1977	West Ham United	Home	1–1	Jordan	16,891
30 April 1977	Bristol City	Home	2–0	Thomas, E. Gray	21,461
4 May 1977	Everton	Home	0–0	—	22,175
7 May 1977	Aston Villa	Away	1–2	McNiven	38,205
10 May 1977	Bristol City	Away	0–1	—	23,587
14 May 1977	Queens Park Rangers	Home	0–1	—	22,226
16 May 1977	Leicester City	Away	1–0	F. Gray	13,642

=== FA Cup ===
Win	Draw	Loss

Round	Date	Opponent	Venue	Result	Scorers	Attendance
Third round	8 January 1977	Norwich City	Home	5–2	Clarke, Jordan, Reaney, Hampton, McQueen	28,130
Fourth round	29 January 1977	Birmingham City	Away	2–1	Clarke, Jordan	38,000
Fifth round	26 February 1977	Manchester City	Home	1–0	Cherry	47,731
Quarter-final	19 March 1977	Wolverhampton Wanderers	Away	1–0	E. Gray	50,000
Semi-final	23 April 1977	Manchester United	Neutral	1–2	Clarke	55,000

=== League Cup ===
Win	Draw	Loss

Round	Date	Opponent	Venue	Result	Scorers	Attendance
Second round	1 September 1976	Stoke City	Away	1–2	Currie	22,550

== Squad ==
Note: Flags indicate national team as defined under FIFA eligibility rules; some limited exceptions apply. Players may hold more than one non-FIFA nationality.

Pos.	Nation	Player
GK	SCO	David Harvey
DF	ENG	Paul Reaney
DF	ENG	Peter Hampton
MF	ENG	Trevor Cherry
DF	SCO	Gordon McQueen
DF	ENG	Paul Madeley
MF	SCO	Frank Gray
FW	ENG	Peter Lorimer
FW	SCO	Joe Jordan
MF	ENG	Tony Currie
FW	SCO	Eddie Gray

Pos.	Nation	Player
FW	ENG	Allan Clarke
GK	SCO	David Stewart
FW	SCO	David McNiven
MF	WAL	Carl Harris
DF	WAL	Byron Stevenson
DF	ENG	Norman Hunter
MF	WAL	Gwyn Thomas
MF	SCO	Billy Bremner
FW	ENG	Ray Hankin
MF	SCO	Billy McGhie
DF	ENG	David Whyte
MF	WAL	Terry Yorath
