= 1973–74 Leeds United A.F.C. season =

1973–74 season of Leeds United

Leeds United
1973–74 season
- Chairman: Manny Cussins
- Manager: Don Revie
- Stadium: Elland Road
- First Division: 1st
- FA Cup: Fifth round
- League Cup: Second round
- UEFA Cup: Third round
- Top goalscorer: League: Mick Jones (14); All: Mick Jones (17)
- Highest home attendance: 47,128 vs Bristol City (19 February 1974, FA Cup)
- Lowest home attendance: 14,196 vs Vitória Setúbal (28 November 1973, UEFA Cup)
- Average home league attendance: 37,026

The 1973–74 season was Leeds United's tenth consecutive season in the First Division and the second season in which they won the First Division. Along with the First Division, Leeds United competed in the UEFA Cup and the FA Cup during the 1973–74 season. The season covers the period from 1 July 1973 to 30 June 1974.

== Squad ==
Note: Flags indicate national team as defined under FIFA eligibility rules; some limited exceptions apply. Players may hold more than one non-FIFA nationality.

Pos.	Nation	Player
GK	SCO	David Harvey
GK	SCO	David Stewart
DF	ENG	Norman Hunter
DF	SCO	Gordon McQueen
DF	SCO	Frank Gray
DF	ENG	Trevor Cherry
DF	ENG	Terry Cooper
DF	ENG	Paul Reaney
DF	ENG	Paul Madeley
DF	ENG	Roy Ellam
DF	ENG	Peter Hampton

Pos.	Nation	Player
DF	ENG	Nigel Davey
MF	ENG	Mick Bates
MF	WAL	Terry Yorath
MF	SCO	Billy Bremner (captain)
MF	IRL	Johnny Giles
MF	SCO	Eddie Gray
FW	SCO	Peter Lorimer
FW	ENG	Allan Clarke
FW	ENG	Mick Jones
FW	SCO	Joe Jordan
FW	SCO	Gary Liddell

== Season summary ==
Having lost in the finals of the Cup Winners Cup and the FA Cup in 1972–73, manager Don Revie considered a move to Everton, but remained with Leeds after the move broke down due to a new law that prevented wage rises to curb inflation. Continuing with what was largely the same squad as during the previous season, he told them his aim was to go unbeaten throughout the season. Leeds started the season well, winning their first 7 league games. This run ended on 22 September when Leeds were held to a 0–0 draw by Manchester United. On 8 October, Leeds were knocked out of the League cup in the Second Round by Ipswich Town. After finding success in the first two rounds of the UEFA Cup, he played weakened teams to allow an early exit from the UEFA Cup, in order to allow his team to focus on the league. Leeds were knocked out in the third round by Vitória FC. At the start of 1974, Leeds were 8 points clear of second placed Liverpool with 19 games remaining and still remaining unbeaten. On 23 February 1974, Leeds lost their first league game, losing 3–2 away to Stoke. Leeds would lose 3 more times in the 1973–74 season, but they won the 1973–74 title going 29 matches unbeaten. This was still a record unbeaten start to a league campaign in the 20th century, and not bettered until Arsenal's 2003–04 campaign. In total Leeds lost just 4 league games and remained in first place for almost the entire campaign. At the end of the season, manager Don Revie left to manage the England national team.

== Competitions ==
=== First Division ===
==== League table ====
Pos	Team	Pld	W	D	L	GF	GA	GAv	Pts	Qualification or relegation
1	Leeds United (C)	42	24	14	4	66	31	2.129	62	Qualification for the European Cup first round
2	Liverpool	42	22	13	7	52	31	1.677	57	Qualification for the Cup Winners' Cup first round (Note: Liverpool qualified for the Cup Winners' Cup first round as the 1973-74 FA Cup winners.)
3	Derby County	42	17	14	11	52	42	1.238	48	Qualification for the UEFA Cup first round
4	Ipswich Town	42	18	11	13	67	58	1.155	47	Qualification for the UEFA Cup first round
5	Stoke City	42	15	16	11	54	42	1.286	46	Qualification for the UEFA Cup first round

Source: World Football
Rules for classification: 1) Points; 2) Goal average; 3) Goals scored
(C) Champions

==== Results by matchday ====
Matchday	1	2	3	4	5	6	7	8	9	10	11	12	13	14	15	16	17	18	19	20	21	22	23	24	25	26	27	28	29	30	31	32	33	34	35	36	37	38	39	40	41	42
Ground	H	A	A	H	H	A	A	H	A	H	A	H	A	H	A	H	A	H	A	A	H	A	A	H	H	A	H	H	A	A	H	H	H	A	H	A	H	A	H	A	H	A
Result	W	W	W	W	W	W	W	D	W	D	D	W	W	W	D	W	D	D	W	W	W	W	D	D	W	D	D	W	W	L	D	D	W	L	L	L	W	D	D	W	W	W
Position	1	2	1	1	1	1	1	1	1	1	1	1	1	1	1	1	1	1	1	1	1	1	1	1	1	1	1	1	1	1	1	1	1	1	1	1	1	1	1	1	1	1

Source: https://www.11v11.com/league-tables/league-division-one/1974/
A = Away; H = Home; W = Win; D = Draw; L = Loss

==== Results ====
Win	Draw	Loss

First Division match details
Date	Opponent	Venue	Result F–A	Scorers	Attendance
25 August 1973	Everton	Home	3–1	Bremner, Giles, Jones	39,325
28 August 1973	Arsenal	Away	2–1	Lorimer, Madeley	47,429
1 September 1973	Tottenham Hotspur	Away	3–0	Bremner (2), Clarke	42,801
5 September 1973	Wolverhampton Wanderers	Home	4–1	Lorimer (2, 1 pen.), Jones, Bremner	39,946
8 September 1973	Birmingham City	Home	3–0	Lorimer (3, 1 pen.)	39,736
11 September 1973	Wolverhampton Wanderers	Away	2–0	Jones, Clarke	36,980
15 September 1973	Southampton	Away	2–1	Clarke (2)	27,770
22 September 1973	Manchester United	Home	0–0	—	47,058
29 September 1973	Norwich City	Away	1–0	Giles	31,993
6 October 1973	Stoke City	Home	1–1	Jones	36,562
13 October 1973	Leicester City	Away	2–2	Jones, Bremner	36,978
20 October 1973	Liverpool	Home	1–0	Jones	44,911
27 October 1973	Manchester City	Away	1–0	Bates	45,346
3 November 1973	West Ham United	Home	4–1	Bates, Jones (2), Clarke	36,869
10 November 1973	Burnley	Away	0–0	—	37,894
17 November 1973	Coventry City	Home	3–0	Clarke, Jordan, Bremner	35,552
24 November 1973	Derby County	Away	0–0	—	36,003
1 December 1973	Queens Park Rangers	Home	2–2	Bremner, Jones	32,194
8 December 1973	Ipswich Town	Away	3–0	Yorath, Jones, Clarke	27,110
15 December 1973	Chelsea	Away	2–1	Jordan, Jones	40,768
22 December 1973	Norwich City	Home	1–0	Yorath	34,747
26 December 1973	Newcastle United	Away	1–0	Madeley	54,474
29 December 1973	Birmingham City	Away	1–1	Jordan	50,451
1 January 1974	Tottenham Hotspur	Home	1–1	Jones	46,545
12 January 1974	Southampton	Home	2–1	Jones, Jordan	35,000
19 January 1974	Everton	Away	0–0	—	55,811
2 February 1974	Chelsea	Home	1–1	Cherry	41,510
5 February 1974	Arsenal	Home	3–1	Simpson (o.g.), Jordan (2)	26,778
9 February 1974	Manchester United	Away	2–0	Jones, Jordan	60,025
23 February 1974	Stoke City	Away	2–3	Bremner, Clarke	39,598
26 February 1974	Leicester City	Home	1–1	Lorimer (pen.)	30,489
2 March 1974	Newcastle United	Home	1–1	Clarke	46,611
9 March 1974	Manchester City	Home	1–0	Lorimer (pen.)	36,578
16 March 1974	Liverpool	Away	0–1	—	56,003
23 March 1974	Burnley	Home	1–4	Clarke	39,335
30 March 1974	West Ham United	Away	1–3	Clarke	37,480
6 April 1974	Derby County	Home	2–0	Lorimer, Bremner	37,838
13 April 1974	Coventry City	Away	0–0	—	35,182
15 April 1974	Sheffield United	Home	0–0	—	41,140
16 April 1974	Sheffield United	Away	2–0	Lorimer (2, 1 pen.)	39,972
20 April 1974	Ipswich Town	Home	3–2	Lorimer, Bremner, Clarke	44,015
27 April 1974	Queens Park Rangers	Away	1–0	Clarke	35,353

=== FA Cup ===
Win	Draw	Loss

FA Cup match details
Round	Date	Opponent	Venue	Result F–A	Scorers	Attendance
Third round	5 January 1974	Wolverhampton Wanderers	Away	1–1	Lorimer (pen.)	38,132
Third round replay	9 January 1974	Wolverhampton Wanderers	Home	1–0	Jones	42,747
Fourth round	26 January 1974	Peterborough United	Away	4–1	Lorimer, Jordan (2), Yorath	28,000
Fifth round	16 February 1974	Bristol City	Away	1–1	Bremner	37,000
Fifth round replay	19 February 1974	Bristol City	Home	0–1	—	47,128

=== League Cup ===
Win	Draw	Loss

League Cup match details
Round	Date	Opponent	Venue	Result F–A	Scorers	Attendance
Second round	8 October 1973	Ipswich Town	Away	0–2	—	26,385

=== UEFA Cup ===
Win	Draw	Loss

UEFA Cup match details
Round	Date	Opponent	Venue	Result F–A	Scorers	Attendance
First round, first leg	19 September 1973	Strømsgodset	Away	1–1	Clarke	16,276
First round, second leg	3 October 1973	Strømsgodset	Home	6–1 (Note: Leeds United win 7–2 on aggregate)	Clarke (2), Jones (2), Gray, Bates	18,711
Second round, first leg	24 October 1973	Hibernian	Home	0–0	—	27,145
Second round, second leg	6 November 1973	Hibernian	Away	0–0 (a.e.t.) (Note: The score was 0–0 on aggregate; Leeds United won 5–4 on penalties)	—	36,051
Third round, first leg	28 November 1973	Vitória	Home	1–0	Cherry	14,196
Third round, second leg	12 December 1973	Vitória	Away	1–3 (Note: Leeds United lost 3–2 on aggregate)	Liddell	14,576
