= Francis Grey =

Francis Grey may refer to:

- Francis William Grey (1860–1939), British-born Canadian writer and academic
- Francis Richard Grey (1813–1890), son of Charles Grey, 2nd Earl Grey
- Francis Grey, a Batman character

== See also ==
- Frances Grey (disambiguation)
- Francis Gray (disambiguation)
