= Joe Jordan =

Scottish professional footballer and coach

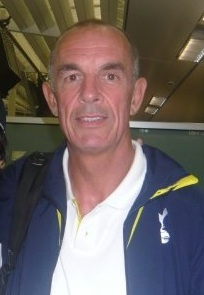
- Jordan, during his time with Tottenham Hotspur

Personal information
- Full name: Joseph Jordan
- Date of birth: 15 December 1951 (age 74)
- Place of birth: Cleland, Scotland
- Height: 6 ft 1 in (1.85 m)
- Position: Forward

Youth career
- Blantyre Victoria

Senior career*
Years	Team	Apps	(Gls)
1968–1970	Morton	6	(1)
1970–1977	Leeds United	170	(35)
1978–1981	Manchester United	109	(37)
1981–1983	Milan	52	(12)
1983–1984	Hellas Verona	12	(1)
1984–1987	Southampton	48	(12)
1987–1988	Bristol City	57	(8)
Total		456	(106)

International career
1973–1982	Scotland	52	(11)

Managerial career
- 1988–1990: Bristol City
- 1990–1993: Heart of Midlothian
- 1993–1994: Stoke City
- 1994–1997: Bristol City
- 2005: Portsmouth (caretaker)
- 2008: Portsmouth (caretaker)
- * Club domestic league appearances and goals

Joseph Jordan (born 15 December 1951) is a Scottish former football player and manager. Playing as a forward, his strong, fearless and committed play contributed to him being nicknamed "Jaws".

Jordan started his senior football career with Greenock Morton in 1968. With Leeds United, he won the 1973–74 Football League First Division and was runner-up in the 1972–73 European Cup Winners' Cup and the 1974–75 European Cup. With Manchester United, he was runner-up in the 1978–79 FA Cup. He won the 1982–83 Serie B title with Milan and was runner-up in the 1983–84 Coppa Italia with Hellas Verona. He helped Southampton to their second highest league finish of fifth in 1984–85, which would have qualified the team for the 1985–86 UEFA Cup had English clubs not been banned following the Heysel Stadium disaster. He ended his playing career with Bristol City, where he also became player-manager.

Jordan gained 52 full Scotland caps, scoring 11 goals. He is the only Scot to score in three World Cups (1974, 1978 and 1982). For his playing efforts for club and country, he was inducted into the Scottish Football Hall of Fame in 2005.

He has managed or coached Bristol City (twice), Heart of Midlothian, Celtic, Stoke City, Northern Ireland, Portsmouth, Tottenham Hotspur, Queens Park Rangers, Middlesbrough and most recently AFC Bournemouth.

== Early life ==
Jordan was born in the village of Cleland, Lanarkshire (sometimes given as the nearby town of Carluke). After leaving school, Jordan became an apprentice draughtsman. At age 15, Jordan had also begun playing for the Scottish Junior Football Association club, Blantyre Victoria.

== Club career ==
=== Morton ===
Jordan began his professional career in 1968, joining Morton from Blantyre Victoria for £250. He initially played for Morton part-time. His only Morton goal was in the 4–1 home league win against Partick Thistle on 14 April 1970. That win clinched Morton's place in the new Texaco Cup. Four days later he was involved in the build-up for Bobby Collins' goal which clinched a 2–0 win at Rangers.

39-year-old Collins was Morton's player-coach. He had started his professional career playing for Celtic, the club Jordan supported as a boy. In 1962, Collins had joined Don Revie's Leeds United for five seasons. Revie later described Collins as "the best signing I ever made". As well as his Morton duties, Collins was now also Leeds' scout in Scotland. Collins personally recommended Jordan to Revie. Revie watched Jordan in Morton's Texaco Cup game at West Bromwich Albion. Morton won both legs (2–1 home and 1–0 away) for a 3–1 aggregate victory. Jordan described Collins as his "footballing godfather". Jordan recalled the Rangers game in his book: "I got involved in the move that resulted in a goal for Collins, my hero and, as it turned out, the man who put in the word that carried me to where I wanted to be, at the top of the professional game".

In total, Jordan made 12 league and cup appearances for Morton.

=== Leeds United ===
Aged 18, Jordan signed for Revie at Leeds in November 1970 for £15,000, plus an extra £5,000 if Jordan made Leeds' first-team. There was little initial prospect of Jordan making the first team ahead of the well-established, successful forward partnership of Allan Clarke and Mick Jones.

Aged 19, Jordan made his First Division debut on 11 September 1971, as the substitute in a 2–0 defeat away to Arsenal. Highlights of this game were shown on ITV's "The Big Match".

In 1973, Jordan made 16 League starts and scored nine goals. However, he was left out of the team that lost the FA Cup final 1–0 to Sunderland. He played in the 1–0 defeat to Milan in the 1973 European Cup Winners' Cup final. Jordan scored seven goals in his 25 games in Leeds' 1973–74 League-winning team.

By 1974, Jordan was Leeds' main target man providing many knock-downs, especially for Peter Lorimer. With other Scottish players at Leeds, Jordan formed part of the so-called "Scottish mafia", alongside goalkeeper David Harvey (1965–1980, 1982–1984), defender Gordon McQueen (1972–1978), midfielder Billy Bremner (1959–1976), left winger Eddie Gray (1965–1983) and right winger Peter Lorimer (1963–1979, 1983–1986).

In the 1974–75 European Cup, Jordan scored in the home first-leg wins over FC Zürich (4–1 for 5–3 on aggregate) and Anderlecht (3–0 for 4–0 on aggregate). Leeds also eliminated Újpesti Dózsa (5–1 on aggregate) and FC Barcelona (3–2 on aggregate). Jordan and Leeds lost the 1975 European Cup final 2–0 to Bayern Munich.

In the 135 league games that Jordan played for Leeds, he scored 39 goals.

=== Manchester United ===
Aged 26, Jordan signed for Manchester United, managed by Dave Sexton, on 4 January 1978 for £350,000. The club reached the 1979 FA Cup final, losing 3–2 to Arsenal. During a 1980 FA Cup third round replay at Old Trafford, Jordan clashed with Tottenham Hotspur's goalkeeper Milija Aleksic, dislocating Aleksic's jaw. The Independent in 2011 described this as a revenge act for Aleksic repeatedly charging Jordan during corners. It became known as the game that saw Tottenham's Glenn Hoddle play in goal.

During Jordan's time at Old Trafford, they were runners-up in the 1979–80 Football League First Division. They recovered from a poor start to the season to finish two points (equivalent to one win at the time) off top spot. The winners were Liverpool, who for 15 years from the mid-1970s succeeded Leeds as England's team to beat. Jordan top scored for United that season with 13 goals, all in the league. United's second place finish qualified them for the 1980–81 UEFA Cup, alongside Bobby Robson's Ipswich Town who finished third. United were eliminated in the UEFA Cup first round by Widzew Łódź on away goals after drawing 1–1 at home and 0–0 in Poland. Ipswich won the UEFA Cup that season. Jordan top scored again that season, this time with 15 (all in the league).

=== Milan ===
Aged 29, Jordan transferred to AC Milan in July 1981. He played in the 1981–82 Serie A season, succeeding Denis Law as the second Scotsman to both play in and score in the Italian Football Championship since its rebranding as Serie A in 1929–30. Jordan scored two goals in his 22 Serie A games that season, the first of which, on 7 November 1981, was the opener in a 1–1 home draw against Como.

In the 1981–82 Coppa Italia, Milan finished third in the five-team group behind group winners Internazionale and Hellas Verona. Jordan's header put Milan 2–1 ahead against Inter in the 49th minute. Walter Novellino had put Milan ahead before Alessandro Altobelli equalised. Giuseppe Bergomi added a second Inter equaliser in the 89th minute for a 2–2 final score.

Milan won the 1981/82 Mitropa Cup. Their opponents in the 4 team round-robin competition were TJ Vítkovice, Haladás and NK Osijek.

Milan went into the last game of the league season in 14th, the third of the relegation places in the 16 team division. To avoid relegation they needed to catch Genoa who were better off by two points (with two points for a win) and a goal difference of four. After 63 minutes, Genoa were losing 2–1 at SSC Napoli. Milan though were losing 2–0 at AC Cesena. Jordan scored in the 67th minute to ignite a comeback to lead 3–2 after 81 minutes. Genoa though equalised in the 85th minute of their match to draw 2–2. With no further goals in either match, Milan were relegated. In all domestic competitions Jordan joint top-scored for Milan that season with Roberto Antonelli, both scoring six goals.

Playing in Serie B in 1982–83, Jordan became the first Scotsman to play in the division since its creation in 1929. He scored 10 goals in 30 Serie B games, with Milan losing only two league games all season and remaining in the top two places in the table from matchweek four onwards. They won promotion back to Serie A as Serie B champions, eight points ahead of 2nd placed Lazio. He was again joint top scorer for Milan with Aldo Serena, scoring 14 goals from his 36 league and cup appearances. Penalties were not taken by an attacking player but by defender Franco Baresi.

Jordan's 30 Serie B appearances record for a Scotsman was surpassed by Liam Henderson in 2019. In 2023, Henderson equalled Jordan's record 10 career Serie B goals by a Scotsman. Henderson's Serie B goals, though, were not in one season.

In the 1982–83 Coppa Italia group stage, Milan's only loss in five games was a 2–1 away defeat to Juventus. Jordan scored Milan's goal, with Paolo Rossi scoring both Juventus goals. Jordan also scored in the group stage home win against Serie A club Genoa. 2–0 down to a Mauro Tassotti own goal and a René Vandereycken strike, Jordan's 43rd minute goal sparked a comeback. Serena added Milan's second and third goals for a 3–2 win. In the quarter-final, Milan played against Hellas Verona, who would finish fourth in Serie A that season and qualify for the UEFA Cup. Milan drew the first, away leg 2–2. In the second leg in Milan, Jordan put his team 3–1 ahead in the 54th minute. However, after Hellas made it 3–3 in the 89th minute, Milan were eliminated 5–5 on away goals.

Jordan completed two seasons at Milan, scoring 12 goals in his 52 league games. He made 66 domestic league and cup appearances, scoring 20 goals.

In 2011, on the eve of a return to the club as a coach with Tottenham, Jordan said that the move to Milan was the best move of his career. He opined that it gave him an experience he had always wanted, namely a chance to play abroad. He retained strong links with Milan, through one of his four children, Caroline, who lives there and raised her children Italian.

=== Hellas Verona ===
Aged 31, Jordan transferred to fellow Serie A club Hellas Verona in 1983. While Jordan had been in Serie B with Milan, Verona finished fourth in the 1982–83 Serie A season, earning a UEFA Cup berth. Jordan played three games in the 1983–84 UEFA Cup campaign. He came on as a substitute in the first round first leg 1–0 home win against Red Star Belgrade as part of a 4–2 aggregate win. He thus became the first Scotsman to play for an Italian club in UEFA-organised competition. In the second round, he played all 90 minutes of the 2–2 home draw and came on as a substitute in the 0–0 away draw against SK Sturm Graz. Verona were thus eliminated on the away goals rule without having lost a game over 90 minutes in that season's UEFA Cup.

Jordan played 24 league and cup games for Verona. His appearances were limited by a combination of his injuries and the good form of Maurizio Iorio (21 goals) and Giuseppe Galderisi (13 goals) that season. Jordan made six substitute appearances in his 12 Verona Serie A games. His only Verona Serie A goal was in the 1–0 home win against UC Sampdoria on 8 April 1984. Verona finished the 1983–84 Serie A season sixth on equal points with Sampdoria and Jordan's former club Milan.

Jordan scored once in nine 1983–84 Coppa Italia games, opening the scoring in the semi-final first leg 2-1 win at SSC Bari. Jordan came on as a substitute in both legs of the 1984 Coppa Italia final, which Verona lost for the second season in a row, this time to AS Roma. After drawing the first leg 1–1 at home, they lost 1–0 in Rome. The defeat in Rome was Jordan's last Verona game. He was the first Scotsman to play in a Coppa Italia final.

Despite his limited game time, Jordan's season with Verona is looked back on as a success. Verona fans appreciated his passion and commitment on the pitch. They displayed a large Scottish flag in the Curva Sud in tribute to him. He was credited with passing on valuable experience to Iorio, Galderisi and other young players at the club. Replacing Jordan with Preben Elkjaer up front, Verona were Italian champions for the first time in their history in 1985.

In August 2023, Jordan was asked by Verona to launch a new club kit. The club said: "Hellas Verona are proud to present the new third match shirt which the players will wear in the 2023/24 season, which sees an example of excellence wearing it forty years after his only season in gialloblù, the unforgettable Scottish champion Joe Jordan".

=== Southampton ===
Aged 32, Jordan returned to England in 1984, signing for Southampton, managed by Lawrie McMenemy, for £150,000. In his first season there he and strike partner Steve Moran shared 34 league and cup goals up front. Jordan played for the Saints in that season's UEFA Cup, drawing 0–0 at home against Hamburger SV before being eliminated after a 2–0 away leg defeat to goals by Manfred Kaltz and Mark McGhee. Southampton finished fifth in the Football League First Division that season. Jordan was their league top scorer with 12 goals from his total league and cup tally of 16. Moran outscored Jordan when including league and cup goals with a total of 18 goals. This remains Southampton's second highest ever league finish, surpassed only by finishing second the season before. Fifth would have earned a UEFA Cup place, but English clubs started a European ban that season following the Heysel Stadium Disaster.

In summer 1985, McMenemy left, replaced by Chris Nicholl who Jordan "didn't know" and would "never get to know". Jordan then severely damaged his knee in a training ground collision with reserve goalkeeper Phil Kite. Cartilage and medial ligament injury meant he was out of the first team until March 1986. He then lost his place in the first team in summer 1986 when the club signed Colin Clarke. Jordan scored for Saints in September 1986 in a 3–0 home win in the Football League Cup against Swindon Town. That was his only game in Southampton's run to that season's semi-final.

=== Bristol City ===
Aged 35, Jordan completed a free transfer to Bristol City in February 1987, where he finished his playing career. He was also player-manager from 1988 to 1989. In 57 Bristol City appearances he scored eight goals, all of which were when City were in the Football League Third Division.

== International career ==
On 19 May 1973, three days after appearing in the European Cup Winners' Cup final for Leeds, Willie Ormond gave Jordan his debut for the Scotland national team. Jordan came on in the 74th minute for Lou Macari in a 1–0 defeat to England at Wembley.

On 26 September 1973, Jordan scored the winning goal with a diving header in a 2–1 comeback win against Czechoslovakia at Hampden Park. That win confirmed Scotland's qualification for the 1974 FIFA World Cup in West Germany. It was Scotland's first World Cup qualification since 1958.

At the tournament, Jordan scored the second goal in Scotland's opening group game, a 2–0 win over Zaire. After a 0–0 draw against Brazil, he scored a last-minute equaliser in a draw 1–1 with Yugoslavia. Scotland finished the group unbeaten, but were eliminated on goal difference.

In Scotland's qualification campaign for the 1978 World Cup, Jordan again scored a winning header against Czechoslovakia at Hampden, this time in a 3–1 win. Czechoslovakia were reigning European champions at the time. Scotland wrapped up qualification in Liverpool. The Welsh FA, in a bid to boost gate receipts, opted to host Scotland at Anfield. The match is remembered for a penalty decision 12 minutes from time. Jordan and Welsh defender David Jones challenged for the ball in the Welsh penalty area, from a throw-in by Scotland's Willie Johnston. The referee awarded a hand ball against Jones for a Scotland penalty. TV replays showed that it was Jordan's hand that connected with the ball. Don Masson converted the penalty, putting Scotland 1–0 ahead. Scotland ultimately won 2–0, securing qualification by winning UEFA Group 7.

In Scotland's opening game of the 1978 World Cup in Argentina, Jordan opened the scoring aginst Peru, but Peru won 3–1. Scotland then drew 1–1 against Iran and won 3–2 against the Netherlands, with Scotland again being eliminated at the group stage of the tournament. Jordan assisted Kenny Dalglish's equaliser against the Netherlands.

Jordan scored in Scotland's 2–2 draw against the Soviet Union at the 1982 World Cup, making him the only Scot to score in three successive World Cup Finals. Subbed off injured in the same game, he never played for Scotland again. In total, Jordan earned 52 full Scotland caps, scoring 11 goals.

== Coaching and management career ==
=== Bristol City ===
Initially player-manager, Jordan was in charge at Bristol City from March 1988 to September 1990 for 134 games. In his first season, City finished fifth in the 1987–88 Football League Third Division. That qualified City for the play-offs in which they lost a final replay to Walsall.

In February 1989, City lost 2–1 on aggregate in the 1988–89 Football League Cup semi-final to eventual winners Nottingham Forest. Among Jordan's signings was Bob Taylor from Leeds in March 1989. City bought Taylor for £250,000 plus Carl Shutt, who was valued at £50,000. Taylor scored eight goals in the 12 City league games he played in the 1988–89 Football League season.

Taylor's 27 league goals made him the leading scorer in the 1989–90 Football League. Taylor also scored seven cup goals for a total of 34 that season. Robbie Turner was Taylor's strike partner, with Alan Walsh, Mark Gavin and Dave Smith the providers for the strikers. Taylor tore a hamstring in a 4-1 win at Crewe Alexandra, causing him to miss six of the season's last seven games. In Taylor's absence, City managed only one win and three draws. In the last of those six games, City lost 3–0 at Bristol Rovers, who overtook City at the top of the table that day. City were promoted as runners-up to their Bristol rivals.

=== Hearts ===
In September 1990 Jordan was appointed manager of Edinburgh-based Scottish Premier Division club, Heart of Midlothian. After a poor start to that season, Hearts had sacked their manager of eight years Alex MacDonald. They turned to Jordan as a high-profile ex-Scotland international striker. He took charge of the club from 10 September.

With 63 points from 44 games, the club finished second in the 1991–92 Scottish Premier Division. Hearts finished nine points behind champions Rangers and one point ahead of third placed Celtic. Hearts led the league for a significant part of the season, losing just two of their first 28 games. In the 1991–92 Scottish Cup semi-final they were eliminated in a replay, losing a penalty shoot-out to Airdrieonians at Hampden Park. In the 1992–93 Scottish Cup semi-final they lost 2–1 to Rangers at Celtic Park.

After a poor run in the 1992–93 season, including a 6–0 loss to Falkirk, later described by the club as a thrashing, the board sacked Jordan. Jordan left the club on 3 May 1993, having registered 69 wins, 31 draws and 43 losses from 143 competitive games. Speaking in 2010, Jordan asserted he had done "particularly well" and the dismissal was undeserved. He reflected: "That's life, you get on with it, nobody's going to listen to your sad stories, but that was a sore one".

=== Celtic ===
In 1993, Jordan became assistant manager to Liam Brady at Celtic, said to be out of an emotional attachment to the club he supported as a boy, and to Brady. Having been in the job since 1991, Brady resigned just four months after Jordan arrived, and Jordan felt obliged to do the same, stating in 2010 that he felt no regrets and that "You've just got to make those calls".

=== Stoke City ===
Jordan was appointed manager of Stoke City in November 1993, replacing fellow Scot Lou Macari. Macari had left to join Jordan's previous club Celtic. Jordan was not a popular choice amongst many Stoke fans, who had expected Denis Smith to be appointed. They eventually accepted Jordan but his style of play soon began to cause fan discontent. Stoke finished the 1993–94 season in 10th position. The 1994–95 season saw no change in the relationship between Jordan and the supporters, and he resigned on 8 September 1994 after a pair of 4–0 defeats. The returning Lou Macari replaced him.

=== Bristol City ===
Jordan returned to Bristol City from November 1994 to March 1997, managing the club for 130 games.

=== Northern Ireland ===
Between 1998 and 2000, he was assistant manager to Lawrie McMenemy with Northern Ireland. The pair were unsuccessful in their attempt to qualify for the 2000 European Championships.

=== Huddersfield Town ===
From December 2000 until May 2002, he was assistant to his former Manchester United team-mate Lou Macari at Huddersfield Town.

=== Portsmouth ===
In 2004 Jordan joined manager Harry Redknapp's Portsmouth coaching team, working with Redknapp and assistant manager Kevin Bond. After Redknapp departed in a dispute with Director of Football Velimir Zajec, Jordan coached under Alain Perrin. Jordan took over as caretaker manager for two games in November 2005 after Perrin's departure. Redknapp then returned after resigning from Southampton. Portsmouth beat Cardiff City 1–0 at Wembley Stadium to win the 2008 FA Cup Final.

On the morning of 26 October 2008, Redknapp left Portsmouth after agreeing a £5m compensation deal, becoming the new manager of Tottenham Hotspur. That left assistant manager Tony Adams and first-team coach Jordan in charge of the team that day. They drew 1–1 at home with Fulham. Adams was formally appointed Portsmouth manager two days later. Adams said: "Joe is Portsmouth through and through, he's part of the woodwork."

=== Tottenham Hotspur ===
On 7 November 2008 Jordan left Portsmouth to join Redknapp at Tottenham Hotspur as first-team coach. That reformed the original Portsmouth back room team; Redknapp had brought in the recently sacked AFC Bournemouth manager Kevin Bond as Tottenham assistant manager.

=== Queens Park Rangers ===
In November 2012, Jordan reunited with Harry Redknapp at Queens Park Rangers as first-team coach.

=== Middlesbrough ===
On 17 March 2017, Jordan was appointed as assistant first-team manager under caretaker manager Steve Agnew at Middlesbrough. Jordan left his post at the end of the 2016–17 season.

=== AFC Bournemouth ===
On 25 February 2021, AFC Bournemouth announced that Jordan had joined the coaching staff. Jordan left his role after the 2020–21 season upon the expiration of his contract.

== Recognition ==
In 2005, Jordan was one of 11 players inducted into the Scottish Football Hall of Fame. Having been born in 1951, Jordan was the second youngest of the 2005 inductees, behind the then Rangers manager Alex McLeish, who was born in 1959. Honouring the "truly great players, managers and officials who have reached the pinnacle of their profession and have made a significant contribution to Scotland's football reputation through their skill, spirit and determination", the induction followed the inaugural 20 Hall of Fame entrants, inducted in November 2004. Citing his "highly successful career at club level" at Leeds, Manchester United and Milan, the Hall of Fame stated Joe would probably be best remembered for his crucial 1973 World Cup qualifying goal against Czechoslovakia.

According to STV in 2010, Jordan's "status as a Scottish legend is safely assured" among the Tartan Army of Scotland's supporters, based on his efforts for the Scotland national team as "braveheart Joe" and his "all-round bravery and commitment to the cause whenever he [played for Scotland]", as well as the crucial goal against Czechoslovakia in 1973, and the controversial penalty against Wales in 1977 (described as the "hand of Joe", in reference to the later Hand of God goal in 1986).

According to The Herald, Jordan's hero status took hold with the goal against Czechoslovakia, due to both its significance and the fact it had been seemingly scored "as if it were an act of sheer will."

On the occasion of the 110th anniversary of AC Milan, Jordan was included in the list of the 110 most important players in the history of AC Milan.

Jordan is described by The Herald as having crossed two eras in his career; having been a Scottish player at the time they were revered in the English game, he went on to coach in England as one of seven Scottish managers or coaches in the Premier League. He attributes this to a common determination and desire to win. In contrast to his era, Jordan lamented the state of the game in Scotland in the late 2000s, which saw a decline in domestic and international Scottish football, a lower profile of Scottish players in England, and a drying up of opportunities for up and coming local players in contrast to his generation.

== "Jaws" persona ==
Jordan was nicknamed "Jaws" early in his playing career due to his lack of front teeth, which had been knocked out during a Leeds United reserve match after he was kicked in the face during a goalmouth scramble. Although they were replaced by dentures, he removed these for safety reasons while playing. In Italy Jordan was nicknamed Lo Squalo ("The Shark"). When Jordan was manager of Bristol City, fans in the stands waved giant inflatable teeth. According to The Times in 2009, images of Jordan's "ferocious fangs as a player still regularly [appeared in] Scottish newpapers [sic] whenever an excuse can be found to hark back to the game's golden age".

Jordan was involved in several confrontations during his time at Tottenham, including with Roy Hodgson, Paul Ince, Alan Pardew, Andy Woodman, and Gennaro Gattuso. Jordan said in 2010 that he rejected the caricature that went along with his persona, stating: "I was what I was, but I look back and I had seven years at Leeds, who were one of the top teams in Europe, then I got a transfer to Manchester United, then a transfer to AC Milan. These are top clubs, and I had opportunities to go to Liverpool, Arsenal, Ajax. I'm not saying that to brag; if those teams thought I had something to offer, it was more than having no teeth."

== Playing and management style ==
As one of the nominees in a public vote organised in April 2010 by STV to name "Scotland's Greatest Team", Jordan was described as an "uncompromising, old fashioned centre forward who was never afraid to put his head where it hurts for club and country", and that during the 1970s and 1980s "there were few more fearsome sights in world football" than Jordan.

In a 2007 list compiled by The Times Jordan was ranked as the 34th hardest man in the history of the game, with the citation "There have been few more fearsome sights in the European game than 'Jaws' Jordan without his front teeth". David O'Leary, when reflecting on his entire playing career as a defender (spent mostly at Arsenal between 1975 and 1993) said of Jordan that he was the most combative forward he had ever faced. He has also been described as a powerhouse in aerial play.

Citing his dislocation of Milija Aleksic's jaw in 1980 as an example, The Independent described in 2011 how Jordan was a player who "did not stand for nonsense on the pitch". According to The Herald in 2010, Jordan had a refinment to his game alongside his strong play, which at the time was almost a necessity if forwards wanted to succeed.

Following the clash with Gattuso, and playing on his hardman reputation, The Independent listed the "Five reasons not to mess with Joe Jordan". Redknapp has said of Jordan as a coach that "You could put your life on him... He is quiet, but when he says something, it is worth listening to."

In coaching, Jordan is described by The Herald as still having the presence and natural authority he had as a player, and of having an enigmatic solemnity about him. In the same interview, while living in Bristol, Jordan was described as having the intensified Scottish patriotism of an exile, who was willing to seize the opportunity to manage the Scotland national team since 2002.

== Personal life ==
Jordan has two sons who have both played professional football: Tom and Andy (who retired due to injury after leaving Hartlepool United). One of his two daughters lives and works in Italy. He has an interest in fine wines, picked up from his time playing in Italy. Jordan supported Celtic as a boy. As of March 2010, Jordan lived with his family in Bristol.

== Career statistics ==
=== Club ===
Appearances and goals by club, season and competition
Club	Season	League			FA Cup		League Cup		Other (Note: Includes European Cup, FA Charity Shield, Football League Trophy, Football League play-offs, Full Members Cup, Inter-Cities Fairs Cup, Screen Sport Super Cup, UEFA Cup, UEFA Cup Winners' Cup and Mitropa Cup.)		Total	
Club	Season	Division	Apps	Goals	Apps	Goals	Apps	Goals	Apps	Goals	Apps	Goals
Leeds United	1970–71	First Division	1	0	0	0	0	0	2	0	2	0
Leeds United	1971–72	First Division	12	0	2	0	0	0	0	0	14	0
Leeds United	1972–73	First Division	26	9	1	0	2	0	7	3	34	12
Leeds United	1973–74	First Division	33	7	5	2	2	0	4	0	44	9
Leeds United	1974–75	First Division	29	4	6	0	4	0	9	2	48	6
Leeds United	1975–76	First Division	17	2	0	0	0	0	0	0	17	2
Leeds United	1976–77	First Division	32	10	5	2	1	0	0	0	38	12
Leeds United	1977–78	First Division	20	3	0	0	3	3	0	0	23	6
Leeds United	Total		170	35	19	4	12	3	22	5	223	47
Manchester United	1977–78	First Division	14	3	2	0	0	0	0	0	16	3
Manchester United	1978–79	First Division	30	6	5	2	2	2	0	0	37	10
Manchester United	1979–80	First Division	32	13	2	0	2	0	0	0	36	13
Manchester United	1980–81	First Division	33	15	3	0	0	0	1	0	37	15
Manchester United	Total		109	37	12	2	4	2	1	0	126	41
Milan	1981–82	Serie A	22	2	4	3	–		4	1	30	6
Milan	1982–83	Serie B	30	10	6	4	–		0	0	36	14
Milan	Total		52	12	10	7	–		4	1	66	20
Hellas Verona	1983–84	Serie A	12	1	0	0	–		–		12	1
Southampton	1984–85	First Division	34	12	3	2	7	2	1	0	45	16
Southampton	1985–86	First Division	12	0	0	0	2	0	2	0	16	0
Southampton	1986–87	First Division	2	0	0	0	1	1	1	0	4	1
Southampton	Total		48	12	3	2	10	3	4	0	65	17
Bristol City	1986–87	Third Division	19	3	0	0	0	0	5	4	24	7
Bristol City	1987–88	Third Division	28	4	1	0	2	0	6	0	37	4
Bristol City	1988–89	Third Division	9	1	0	0	6	0	0	0	15	1
Bristol City	1989–90	Third Division	1	0	0	0	0	0	0	0	1	0
Bristol City	Total		57	8	1	0	8	0	11	4	77	12
Career total			448	105	45	15	34	8	42	10	569	138

=== International ===
International statistics
National team	Year	Apps	Goals
Scotland
Scotland	1973	6	1
Scotland	1974	10	4
Scotland	1975	1	1
Scotland	1976	5	0
Scotland	1977	5	1
Scotland	1978	8	1
Scotland	1979	5	1
Scotland	1980	4	0
Scotland	1981	4	1
Scotland	1982	4	1
Total		52	11

Scores and results list Scotland's goal tally first.

#	Date	Venue	Opponent	Score	Result	Competition
1	26 September 1973	Hampden Park, Glasgow	Czechoslovakia	2–1	2–1	WCQG8
2	18 May 1974	Hampden Park, Glasgow	England	1–0	2–0	BHC
3	6 June 1974	Ullevaal Stadion, Oslo	Norway	1–1	2–1	Friendly
4	14 June 1974	Westfalenstadion, Dortmund	Zaire	2–0	2–0	WCG2
5	22 June 1974	Waldstadion, Frankfurt	Yugoslavia	1–1	1–1	WCG2
6	5 February 1975	Estadio Luis Casanova, Valencia	Spain	1–0	1–1	ECQG4
7	21 September 1977	Hampden Park, Glasgow	Czechoslovakia	1–0	3–1	WCQG7
8	3 June 1978	Córdoba	Peru	1–0	1–3	WCG4
9	7 June 1979	Ullevaal Stadion, Oslo	Norway	1–0	4–0	ECQG2
10	9 September 1981	Hampden Park, Glasgow	Sweden	1–0	2–0	WCQG8
11	22 June 1982	Estadio La Rosaleda, Málaga	Soviet Union	1–0	2–2	WCG6

=== Managerial ===
Managerial record by team and tenure
Team	From	To	Record				
Team	From	To	P	W	D	L	Win %
Bristol City	16 March 1988	1 September 1990	134	68	36	30	50.7
Heart of Midlothian	10 September 1990	3 May 1993	143	69	31	43	48.3
Stoke City	10 November 1993	8 September 1994	40	13	14	13	32.5
Bristol City	15 November 1994	24 March 1997	130	42	51	37	32.3
Portsmouth	24 November 2005	7 December 2005	2	0	2	0	0.0
Portsmouth	26 October 2008	28 October 2008	1	0	0	1	0.0
Total			450	192	134	124	42.7

== Honours ==
Leeds United

- Football League First Division: 1973–74
- European Cup runner-up: 1974–75
- European Cup Winners' Cup runner-up: 1972–73

Manchester United

- FA Cup runner-up: 1978–79

Milan

- Serie B: 1982–83
- Mitropa Cup: 1982

Hellas Verona

- Coppa Italia runner-up: 1983–84

Bristol City

- Associate Members' Cup runner-up: 1986–87

Heart of Midlothian

- Tennents' Sixes: 1991

Individual

- Scottish Football Hall of Fame, 2005 inductee
- Scotland national football team roll of honour: 1982
