= 1980–81 Leeds United A.F.C. season =

1980–81 season of Leeds United

Leeds United
1980–81 season
- Chairman: Manny Cussins
- Manager: Jimmy Adamson (until 1 October); Dave Merrington (caretaker, until 1 Oct); Allan Clarke (from 1 October)
- Stadium: Elland Road
- First Division: 9th
- FA Cup: Third round
- League Cup: Second round
- Top goalscorer: League: Carl Harris (10); All: Carl Harris (10)
- Highest home attendance: 39,206 vs Liverpool (18 April 1981, First Division)
- Lowest home attendance: 14,333 vs Brighton & Hove Albion (29 November 1980, First Division)
- Average home league attendance: 21,377

The 1980–81 season was Leeds United's seventeenth consecutive season in the Football League First Division.

== Season summary ==
Leeds began the season in the same poor form that they ended the previous season in, leaving them in the relegation zone for the first few months of the season. Manager Jimmy Adamson resigned after a 4-1 thrashing at the hands of Sunderland, the club he had walked out on to take charge of Leeds two years earlier. With attendances at their lowest level since the club's last spell in the Second Division, the board tried to win back the supporters by appointing former hero Allan Clarke, who had just steered Barnsley to promotion from the Fourth Division.

Leeds's form picked up greatly after Clarke's appointment, albeit they were knocked out of the FA Cup at the first hurdle by Coventry City, having already been knocked out of the League Cup by eventual Division One champions Aston Villa while Adamson was still manager. The club eventually finished a solid ninth place. While their having the lowest goalscoring record of any top-flight club that season was cause for concern, it was offset by having one of the best defences in the division; however, their inability to score would foreshadow much bigger, and ultimately terminal, problems they would face next season.

== Competitions ==
=== Football League First Division ===
==== League table ====
Pos	Team	Pld	W	D	L	GF	GA	GD	Pts	Qualification or relegation
7	Nottingham Forest	42	19	12	11	62	44	+18	50	
8	Manchester United	42	15	18	9	51	36	+15	48	
9	Leeds United	42	17	10	15	39	47	−8	44	
10	Tottenham Hotspur	42	14	15	13	70	68	+2	43	Qualification for the European Cup Winners' Cup first round (Note: Tottenham Hotspur qualified for the European Cup Winners' Cup first round as the 1980–81 FA Cup winners.)
11	Stoke City	42	12	18	12	51	60	−9	42	

Source: World Football
Rules for classification: 1) Points; 2) Goal difference; 3) Goals scored

==== Matches ====
Win	Draw	Loss

First Division match results
Date	Opponent	Venue	Result F–A	Scorers	Attendance
16 August 1980	Aston Villa	Home	1–2	Stevenson (pen.)	23,401
19 August 1980	Middlesbrough	Away	0–3	—	19,470
23 August 1980	Norwich City	Away	3–2	Hart, Graham, Connor	17,890
30 August 1980	Leicester City	Home	1–2	Hart	18,530
6 September 1980	Stoke City	Away	0–3	—	12,729
13 September 1980	Tottenham Hotspur	Home	0–0	—	21,947
20 September 1980	Manchester United	Home	0–0	—	32,539
27 September 1980	Sunderland	Away	1–4	Parlane	29,619
4 October 1980	Ipswich Town	Away	1–1	Sabella	24,087
8 October 1980	Manchester City	Home	1–0	Harris	19,134
11 October 1980	Everton	Home	1–0	Curtis	25,601
18 October 1980	Wolverhampton Wanderers	Away	1–2	Connor	20,699
22 October 1980	Nottingham Forest	Away	1–2	Harris	25,033
25 October 1980	Crystal Palace	Home	1–0	Connor	19,208
1 November 1980	Coventry City	Away	1–2	Connor	13,970
8 November 1980	Arsenal	Home	0–5	—	20,855
12 November 1980	Middlesbrough	Home	2–1	Hird (2, 1 pen.)	17,382
15 November 1980	Aston Villa	Away	1–1	Sabella	29,106
22 November 1980	Southampton	Away	1–2	Graham	20,278
29 November 1980	Brighton & Hove Albion	Home	1–0	Harris	14,333
6 December 1980	West Bromwich Albion	Away	2–1	Harris, Graham	17,771
13 December 1980	Nottingham Forest	Home	1–0	Greenhoff	21,882
20 December 1980	Manchester City	Away	0–1	—	31,866
26 December 1980	Birmingham City	Home	0–0	—	19,214
27 December 1980	Liverpool	Away	0–0	—	44,086
10 January 1981	Southampton	Home	0–3	—	21,007
17 January 1981	Leicester City	Away	1–0	Hart	16,094
31 January 1981	Norwich City	Home	1–0	Harris	15,836
7 February 1981	Tottenham Hotspur	Away	1–1	Harris	32,372
14 February 1981	Stoke City	Home	1–3	Flynn	16,530
21 February 1981	Sunderland	Home	1–0	Harris	23,236
28 February 1981	Manchester United	Away	1–0	Flynn	45,733
14 March 1981	Everton	Away	2–1	Parlane, Harris	23,014
21 March 1981	Wolverhampton Wanderers	Home	1–3	Harris	19,252
28 March 1981	Crystal Palace	Away	1–0	Parlane	15,053
31 March 1981	Ipswich Town	Home	3–0	Hird, Harris, Hart	26,462
4 April 1981	Coventry City	Home	3–0	Stevenson, Parlane, Flynn	15,882
11 April 1981	Arsenal	Away	0–0	—	29,339
18 April 1981	Liverpool	Home	0–0	—	39,206
21 April 1981	Birmingham City	Away	2–0	Parlane, Hird (pen.)	14,505
2 May 1981	Brighton & Hove Albion	Away	0–2	—	27,577
6 May 1981	West Bromwich Albion	Home	0–0	—	17,218

=== FA Cup ===
Win	Draw	Loss

FA Cup match details
Round	Date	Opponent	Venue	Result F–A	Scorers	Attendance
Third round	3 January 1981	Coventry City	Home	1–1	Hird (pen.)	24,523
Third round replay	6 March 1981	Coventry City	Away	0–1	—	22,057

=== Football League Cup ===
Win	Draw	Loss

League Cup match details
Round	Date	Opponent	Venue	Result F–A	Scorers	Attendance
Second round, first leg	27 August 1980	Aston Villa	Away	0–1	—	24,238
Second round, second leg	3 September 1980	Aston Villa	Home	1–3	Graham 13'	12,236
