= Frances Grey =

Frances Grey may refer to:

- Frances Grey (actress) (born 1970), Scottish television actress
- Frances Grey, Duchess of Suffolk (1517–1559), granddaughter of Henry VII of England and mother of Lady Jane Grey
- Frances Marie Gray, Australian philosopher
- Frances Gray (playwright)

== See also ==
- Frances M. Gray (1910–2001), first president of Damavand College (1968-1975)
- Frances Gray Patton (1906–2000), writer
- Francis Gray (disambiguation)
