= Frank Gray (disambiguation) =

Frank Gray (born 1954) is a British football player and manager.

Francis or Frank Gray may also refer to:

- Frank Gray (researcher) (1887–1969), American physicist, remembered for the Gray code, a binary numeral system
- Frank Gray (politician) (1880–1935), British Liberal Member of Parliament for Oxford, 1922–1924
- Frank Gray (cricketer) (1873–1947), cricketer
- Frank Gray Jr. (1908–1978), U.S. federal judge
- Frank Fellows Gray (1863–1935), Boy Scouts pioneer
- Frank Gray (rugby league) (1905–1993), Australian rugby player
- Francis Calley Gray (1790–1856), politician from Massachusetts
- Francis Gray, 14th Lord Gray (1765–1842), Scottish peer, politician and soldier
- Francis Campbell Gray, bishop of the Episcopal Diocese of Northern Indiana

== See also ==
- Frank Grey (disambiguation)
- Frances Grey (disambiguation) for the female version of the name
