= Eddie Gray (footballer, born 1948) =

Scottish footballer

Eddie Gray MBE
Personal information
- Full name: Edwin Gray
- Date of birth: 17 January 1948 (age 78)
- Place of birth: Glasgow, Scotland
- Height: 5 ft 11 in (1.80 m)
- Position: Winger

Youth career
- 1965–1966: Leeds United

Senior career*
Years	Team	Apps	(Gls)
1966–1983	Leeds United	454	(52)

International career
1969–1977	Scotland	12	(3)

Managerial career
- 1982–1985: Leeds United
- 1985–1986: Whitby Town
- 1986–1988: Rochdale
- 1988–1989: Hull City
- 2003–2004: Leeds United
- * Club domestic league appearances and goals

Edwin Gray MBE (born 17 January 1948) is a Scottish former football player and coach. Gray was a winger, who was an integral member of the legendary Leeds United team of the 1960s and 1970s, later twice becoming the club's manager.

In 2000, Gray was voted as the third Greatest Leeds United player of all time, surpassed only by his club captain, Billy Bremner (No. 1) and John Charles (No. 2). He was also voted into the Greatest Leeds United team of all time. His two goals against Burnley in 1970 feature in Leeds United's Greatest 100 goals – the second of which is widely regarded as the greatest Leeds United goal of all time and recently featured in The Times as one of the five greatest ever goals. On 9 May 2013, Gray was also appointed as Leeds United football Ambassador. Gray was also inducted into the English Hall of Fame on 25 September 2013 at an awards evening in Manchester.

Gray played in 12 full international games for Scotland between 1969 and 1977. Besides his two stints with Leeds, Gray also managed Whitby Town, Rochdale and Hull City during the 1980s.

He was appointed MBE in the 1983 Birthday Honours.

== Playing career ==
Gray was born in Glasgow and brought up in the city's Castlemilk district. He was a schoolboy international for Scotland. He had aspirations of signing for his boyhood team Celtic, but signed professional forms with Leeds United at the age of 16. He made his first team debut on New Year's Day 1966, less than three weeks before his 18th birthday, and would go on to play for the club for almost 20 years. A winger in the classic mould, Gray was feted in world football for his ability to beat opposing full backs for skill, pace and thought. As the Leeds team grew in stature and experience through the 1960s, Gray became a vital component of the team.

In 1968, he was in the Leeds team which won the League Cup and the Fairs Cup double, scoring winning goals in both semi-finals, including a memorable individual goal against Brian Clough's Derby County in the semi-final of the League Cup. However injury meant he missed the second leg of the Fairs Cup final. He was then an important part of the team that won League championship a year later, making 33 appearances and scoring five goals, during a season in which United scored a record number of championship points and lost only two matches along the way to conquering the title. However it was in 1970 that he would make his most famous appearance in a Leeds shirt.

Gray's marking full back was David Webb, a steady but undistinguished defender whom, for the 90 minutes and extra-time period, Gray tormented. Webb was repeatedly left on his backside or looking the wrong way as Gray ghosted past him, including one run where he cut inside onto his 'weaker' right foot and crashed a shot against the crossbar. Though Leeds dominated the match, the game still ended 2–2 and a replay was required – Gray had taken the corner which had allowed Jack Charlton to open the scoring. In the replay, Chelsea changed tactics and put the more uncompromising Ron Harris on to Gray and as a result, the danger was snuffed out – Harris badly injured Gray with a brutal tackle to the back of the knee. Chelsea won 2–1 and, in a final twist, it was Webb who scored the winner. Leeds lost the League championship race to Everton and the European Cup semi-final to Celtic, thereby ended with nothing.

Gray's frequent battles with injury started, and he missed more than half of the 1970–71 season, during which Leeds again snatched League championship defeat from the jaws of victory but won the Fairs Cup for the second time against Juventus. He found devastating form again for part of the 1971–72 season in which he was part of the team that destroyed Manchester United and Southampton consecutively at Elland Road, by scorelines of 5–1 and 7–0; the match footage of both games would become iconic. Later in the same season he featured in the team which won the 1972 FA Cup Final against Arsenal and featured again in the following cup final which Leeds surprisingly lost to Sunderland. He missed the controversial 1973 UEFA Cup Winners' Cup Final defeat to A.C. Milan, and missed most of the season in 1973–74 when Leeds won the League title again thanks to more injury woes. These injuries had become so frequent that when Brian Clough succeeded Don Revie at Leeds United, he began his first team meeting by stating that if Eddie Gray had been a horse, he would have been shot long ago.

His performance on the wing earned the famous tribute from Revie that when he plays on snow, he doesn't leave any footprints. Gray played in the team which reached the 1975 European Cup Final in Paris, featuring in the home victory against the Spanish champions Barcelona in the semi-final, during which Gray tormented his marker de la Cruz and pushed Barcelona onto the back foot, allowing Leeds to dominate. However, he was left from the starting line up for the final by manager Jimmy Armfield, which Leeds would go on to lose controversially to Bayern Munich. Also featuring in this campaign was his younger brother Frank, who had likewise come through the ranks at Elland Road. This was the swansong of the great Don Revie team (Revie himself had left a year earlier to take over as England manager) and Gray's teammates started to leave the club. By the early 1980s, Gray was the only player from any part of the Revie era still at the club (although Peter Lorimer and David Harvey would later make comebacks). Converted to left back, Gray prolonged his career and was in the side which was relegated under former teammate Allan Clarke in 1982.

Gray's unfortunate injury record meant that his Scotland career was short and infrequent. He won just 12 caps and missed the 1974 FIFA World Cup through injury. In an era of hard men – Bremner, Harris, Smith, etc., Gray also had the distinction of never being booked in his career.

== Managerial career ==
Gray then took over as player-manager at Leeds in 1982, following their relegation from the First Division. The club had to turn to a youth policy to rebuild the team, with the emergence of players like John Sheridan, Neil Aspin, Denis Irwin and Scott Sellars. After top half finishes in his first two seasons in charge, the 1984–85 season saw a push for promotion that was lost on the final day at Birmingham City. Following failure to gain promotion from the Second Division, Gray ended association with Leeds after 20 years, 561 games and 68 goals.

He would later manage Whitby Town. In 1986, Gray took over at Rochdale and in the 1986–87 season the club managed an escape from near-certain relegation from the Football League.

Gray took over at Hull City for season 1988–89, following the departure of Brian Horton the previous season. Hull managed to pull into mid-table and only five points short of the play-offs in February, and they reached the FA Cup fifth round where they lost to Liverpool. Only 1 win in the last 18 games meant that Hull finished fourth from bottom, yet clear of relegation danger, but the poor form led to his departure.

== Return to Leeds ==
Gray continued his long standing association with Leeds United by joining the club as a Youth Team coach. His work with the youth set-up nurtured a terrific generation of Leeds players such as Harry Kewell, Ian Harte, Alan Smith and Jonathan Woodgate, who all went on to become first-team regulars. In 1997, Gray was promoted to Reserve Team Manager and the following year was made new manager David O'Leary's assistant.

To the aggravation of Leeds supporters, Gray was forced to take a back step when Brian Kidd was promoted from Academy Manager to Head Coach and was given all coaching responsibilities. The fans made their support known for Gray through banners at matches, whilst at the same time verbally abusing Kidd. Both Gray and Kidd were relieved of their duties in 2003 when new manager Peter Reid took the reins.

When Reid left Leeds in November 2003, Gray was charged with the task of trying to preserve their FA Premier League status, something which, under immense pressure, he could not do. Gray was then given a one-year football consultancy role at the club before joining BBC Radio Leeds as a matchday analyst. In 2008, the BBC lost their rights to the live radio broadcast of Leeds matches; as a result, Gray left BBC Radio Leeds and moved to the club's official radio station, Yorkshire Radio.

On 9 May 2013, Gray was appointed Football Ambassador at Leeds United and would also remain in his role as Yorkshire Radio Co-Commentator. He is currently co-commentator alongside Thom Kirwin for Leeds United's own TV and Radio Channel LUTV.

== Family football links ==
Eddie Gray's son Stuart (who predeceased his father in 2024) followed into professional football, playing for Celtic, the team Eddie had supported as a boy. His nephew, Andy Gray, son of his brother Frank, was another professional footballer and also played for Leeds. Eddie's great-nephews Archie and Harry Gray are also professional footballers.

== Career statistics ==
Appearances and goals by club, season and competition
Club	Season	League			FA Cup		League Cup		Europe		Total	
Club	Season	Division	Apps	Goals	Apps	Goals	Apps	Goals	Apps	Goals	Apps	Goals
Leeds United	1965–66	First Division	4	1	–		–		2	0	6	1
Leeds United	1966–67	First Division	29	4	4	0	1	0	6	0	40	4
Leeds United	1967–68	First Division	32	6	3	0	7	1	8	2	50	9
Leeds United	1968–69	First Division	33	5	2	0	2	0	6	0	43	5
Leeds United	1969–70	First Division	30	9	7	0	2	0	5	0	44	9
Leeds United	1970–71	First Division	18	1	–		1	0	5	3	24	4
Leeds United	1971–72	First Division	26	6	6	0	1	0	–		33	6
Leeds United	1972–73	First Division	17	1	3	0	3	0	2	0	25	1
Leeds United	1973–74	First Division	8	0	–		–		1	0	9	0
Leeds United	1974–75	First Division	12	1	6	1	–		3	0	21	2
Leeds United	1975–76	First Division	29	1	1	0	2	0	–		32	1
Leeds United	1976–77	First Division	37	5	5	1	–		–		42	6
Leeds United	1977–78	First Division	27	5	–		4	2	–		31	7
Leeds United	1978–79	First Division	28	4	1	2	7	3	–		36	9
Leeds United	1979–80	First Division	30	2	1	0	–		3	0	34	2
Leeds United	1980–81	First Division	38	0	2	0	–		–		40	0
Leeds United	1981–82	First Division	31	1	2	1	2	0	–		35	2
Leeds United	1982–83	Second Division	21	0	4	0	3	0	–		28	0
Leeds United	1983–84	Second Division	4	0	–		–		–		4	0
Career total			454	52	47	5	35	6	41	5	577	68

== Honours ==
=== Player ===
Leeds United

- Football League First Division: 1968–69, 1973–74
- FA Cup: 1971–72; runner-up 1969–70, 1972–73
- Football League Cup: 1967–68
- FA Charity Shield: 1969
- European Cup: runner-up: 1974–75
- European Cup Winners' Cup runner-up: 1972–73
- Inter-Cities Fairs Cup: 1967–68, 1970–71

Scotland

- British Home Championship: 1975–76, 1976–77

=== Manager ===
Whitby Town

- North Riding Senior Cup: 1989–90

== See also ==
- List of Leeds United F.C. players
- List of one-club men in association football
- List of Scotland international footballers
- List of Scottish football families
