= Frank Grey =

Frank Grey may refer to:

- Frank Grey (umpire), South African cricket umpire
- Frank R. Grey, English illustrator

== See also ==
- Frank Gray (disambiguation)
