= 1971–72 Leeds United A.F.C. season =

1971–72 season of Leeds United

Leeds United
1971–72 season
- Chairman: Percy Woodward
- Manager: Don Revie
- Stadium: Elland Road
- First Division: 2nd
- FA Cup: Winners
- League Cup: Third round
- UEFA Cup: First round
- Top goalscorer: League: Peter Lorimer (23); All: Peter Lorimer (29)
- Highest home attendance: 46,565 vs Chelsea, First Division, 1 May 1972
- Lowest home attendance: 18,623 vs Newcastle United, First Division, 1 September 1971
- Average home league attendance: 35,666
- Biggest win: 7–0 vs Southampton, First Division, 4 March 1972
- Biggest defeat: 0–4 vs Lierse S.K., UEFA Cup, 29 September 1971

The 1971–72 season was Leeds United's eighth consecutive season in the Football League First Division, the top tier of English football, where they finished 2nd, one point behind winners Derby County. Alongside the First Division, the club competed in the FA Cup, Football League Cup and the UEFA Cup. Leeds won the FA Cup, beating Arsenal 1–0 in the final on 6 May 1972. They were eliminated from the Football League Cup in the third round and were knocked out of the UEFA Cup by Lierse S.K. in the first round.

== Background ==
In March 1961, the club appointed former player Don Revie as manager, following the resignation of Jack Taylor. His stewardship began in adverse circumstances; the club was in financial difficulty and in 1961–62 only a win in the final game of the season saved the club from relegation to Division Three. Revie implemented a youth policy and a change of kit colour to an all-white strip in the style of Real Madrid, and Leeds soon won promotion to the First Division in 1963–64. Leeds adapted well to the First Division in the 1964–65 campaign, finishing second to rivals Manchester United on goal difference. It took the club until 1968 to win their first major honour, winning the League Cup with Terry Cooper scoring the only goal of a 1–0 victory in the final against Arsenal. They also won the 1968 Inter-Cities Fairs Cup Final, beating Hungarian club Ferencváros over two legs. Leeds won the first leg 1–0, and a month later defended their lead with a 0–0 draw in Budapest, before winning the First Division for the first time in the 1968–69 campaign.

Having rejected an offer to manage Birmingham City, Revie chose to remain at Leeds for the 1970–71 campaign. Leeds and Arsenal both challenged for the title that season, though it would be the Gunners who would claim the league title, finishing one point ahead of Leeds after the latter lost to West Bromwich Albion following a controversial offside goal. United were also knocked out of the FA Cup by Fourth Division side Colchester United. Leeds again found success in the Inter-Cities Fairs Cup though, beating Juventus in the final on away goals.

== Season summary ==
As a result of the pitch invasion against West Bromwich Albion, Leeds were banned from playing their first five home games of the 1971–72 season at home, but still managed to pick up 6 points from 8 in those games. However, they still managed to mount a challenge for the Double; an Allan Clarke goal was enough as Leeds beat Arsenal 1–0 in the FA Cup Final, but once again heavy fixture congestion meant that Leeds had to play three crucial games within the space of one week; an away match against Chelsea in the league three days before the FA cup final and they had to play their final league game less than two days after the final, which was away to Wolves. Leeds only had to draw this game to win the title, but they were beaten. The league went to Derby County, again by 1 point. Eric Todd of the Guardian wrote on the situation in the week prior to these games: "If Leeds fail to win either the Cup or the League title they need not blame loss of form. They must blame the system. And if Leeds cannot field a full strength side against Arsenal at Wembley, the crowd can blame the Football League and Chelsea who have decided that their jaunt to the West Indies, or wherever it is, is more important than trying to help Leeds prepare properly for crucial football matches." In later years controversy surrounding the Wolves game would develop into a match-fixing scandal, with accusations directed towards Leeds United captain Billy Bremner. However Bremner would clear his name of these allegations in court, with evidence given for Bremner by Wolves's captain and forward Derek Dougan, who scored the winning goal in the match at Molineux.

== Competitions ==
=== Football League First Division ===
==== League table ====
Pos	Team	Pld	W	D	L	GF	GA	GAv	Pts	Qualification or relegation
1	Derby County (C)	42	24	10	8	69	33	2.091	58	Qualification for the European Cup first round
2	Leeds United	42	24	9	9	73	31	2.355	57	Qualification for the European Cup Winners' Cup first round (Note: Leeds United qualified for the European Cup Winners' Cup as the 1971-72 FA Cup winners.)
3	Liverpool	42	24	9	9	64	30	2.133	57	Qualification for the UEFA Cup first round
4	Manchester City	42	23	11	8	77	45	1.711	57	Qualification for the UEFA Cup first round
5	Arsenal	42	22	8	12	58	40	1.450	52	

Source: World Football
Rules for classification: 1) Points; 2) Goal average; 3) Goals scored
(C) Champions

==== Matches ====
Win	Draw	Loss

First Division match results
Date	Opponent	Venue	Result F–A	Scorers	Attendance
14 August 1971	Manchester City	Away	1–0	Lorimer	38,566
17 August 1971	Sheffield United	Away	0–3	—	40,725
21 August 1971	Wolverhampton Wanderers	Home (played at neutral venue)	0–0	—	20,686
25 August 1971	Tottenham Hotspur	Home (played at neutral venue)	1–1	Bremner	25,099
28 August 1971	Ipswich Town	Away	2–0	Lorimer, Belfitt	26,689
1 September 1971	Newcastle United	Home (played at neutral venue)	5–1	Charlton, Lorimer, Giles (pen.), Yorath, Madeley	18,623
4 September 1971	Crystal Palace	Home (played at neutral venue)	2–0	Madeley, Giles (pen.)	18,715
11 September 1971	Arsenal	Away	0–2	—	51,196
18 September 1971	Liverpool	Home (played at neutral venue)	1–0	Lorimer	41,381
25 September 1971	Huddersfield Town	Away	1–2	Charlton	26,340
2 October 1971	West Ham United	Home	0–0	—	30,942
9 October 1971	Coventry City	Away	1–3	Parker (o.g.)	32,183
16 October 1971	Manchester City	Home	3–0	Clarke, Jones, Lorimer	36,004
23 October 1971	Everton	Home	3–2	Cooper, Charlton, Lorimer	34,208
30 October 1971	Manchester United	Away	1–0	Lorimer	53,960
6 November 1971	Leicester City	Home	2–1	Bremner, Lorimer	39,877
13 November 1971	Southampton	Away	1–2	Giles	25,331
20 November 1971	Stoke City	Home	1–0	Lorimer	32,012
27 November 1971	Nottingham Forest	Away	2–0	Lorimer, Clarke	29,463
4 December 1971	West Bromwich Albion	Home	3–0	Giles (2), Lorimer	32,521
11 December 1971	Chelsea	Away	0–0	—	45,867
18 December 1971	Crystal Palace	Away	1–1	Lorimer	31,456
27 December 1971	Derby County	Home	3–0	Gray, Lorimer (2)	44,214
1 January 1972	Liverpool	Away	2–0	Clarke, Jones	53,847
8 January 1972	Ipswich Town	Home	2–2	Bremner, Clarke	32,194
22 January 1972	Sheffield United	Home	1–0	Clarke	41,038
29 January 1972	Tottenham Hotspur	Away	0–1	—	46,774
12 February 1972	Everton	Away	0–0	—	45,935
19 February 1972	Manchester United	Home	5–1	Jones (3), Clarke, Lorimer	45,399
4 March 1972	Southampton	Home	7–0	Clarke (2), Lorimer (3), Charlton, Jones	34,275
11 March 1972	Coventry City	Home	1–0	Charlton	43,154
22 March 1972	Leicester City	Away	0–0	—	32,152
25 March 1972	Arsenal	Home	3–0	Clarke, Jones, Lorimer	45,055
27 March 1972	Nottingham Forest	Home	6–1	Lorimer (2), Gray (2), Clarke (2)	40,866
31 March 1972	West Ham United	Away	2–2	Gray (2)	41,003
1 April 1972	Derby County	Away	0–2	—	39,450
5 April 1972	Huddersfield Town	Home	3–1	Jones, Lorimer, Gray	46,148
8 April 1972	Stoke City	Away	3–0	Jones (2), Lorimer	35,123
19 April 1972	Newcastle United	Away	0–1	—	42,006
22 April 1972	West Bromwich Albion	Away	1–0	Giles (pen.)	39,724
1 May 1972	Chelsea	Home	2–0	Bremner, Jones	46,565
8 May 1972	Wolverhampton Wanderers	Away	1–2	Bremner	53,379

=== FA Cup ===
Win	Draw	Loss

FA Cup match results
Round	Date	Opponent	Venue	Result F–A	Scorers	Attendance
Third round	15 January 1972	Bristol Rovers	Home	4–1	Giles (2), Lorimer (2)	33,565
Fourth round	5 February 1972	Liverpool	Away	0–0	—	56,300
Fourth round replay	9 February 1972	Liverpool	Home	2–0	Clarke (2)	45,821
Fifth round	26 February 1972	Cardiff City	Away	2–0	Giles (2)	50,000
Sixth round	18 March 1972	Tottenham Hotspur	Home	2–1	Clarke, Charlton	43,937
Semi-final	15 April 1972	Birmingham City	Neutral	3–0	Jones (2), Lorimer	55,000
Final	6 May 1972	Arsenal	Neutral	1–0	Clarke	100,000

=== League Cup ===
Win	Draw	Loss

League Cup match details
Round	Date	Opponent	Venue	Result F–A	Scorers	Attendance
Second round	8 September 1971	Derby County	Away	0–0	—	34,023
Second round replay	27 September 1971	Derby County	Home	2–0	Lorimer (2)	29,132
Third round	6 October 1971	West Ham United	Away	0–0	—	35,890
Third round replay	20 October 1971	West Ham United	Home	0–1 (a.e.t.)	—	26,504

=== UEFA Cup ===
Win	Draw	Loss

UEFA Cup match details
Round	Date	Opponent	Venue	Result F–A	Scorers	Attendance
First round first leg	15 September 1971	Lierse S.K.	Away	2–0	Galvin, Lorimer	17,000
First round second leg	29 September 1971	Lierse S.K.	Home	0–4	—	18,600

=== Inter-Cities Fairs Cup Trophy play-off ===
Win	Draw	Loss

Inter-Cities Fairs Cup Trophy play-off match details
Date	Opponent	Venue	Result F–A	Scorers	Attendance
22 September 1971	Barcelona	Away	1–2	Jordan	35,000
