= Frances Gray (playwright) =

British literary critic

Frances B. Gray

Academic work
- Discipline: literary critic
- Institutions: University of Sheffield

Frances B. Gray is a literary critic and playwright and former Reader in Drama at the University of Sheffield. She previously taught at Allegheny College, Pennsylvania, and at the University of Lodz. Gray is known for her work on comedy, crime, John Arden and Noël Coward and her plays for the stage and for radio. She was a member of the judging team for the Gold Dagger Awards for the best crime novel of the year and has won awards for scriptwriting from the Radio Times.

== Works ==
- John Arden, Macmillan 1982
- Noel Coward, Red Globe Press London 1987
- Women and Laughter, Palgrave Macmillan 1994
- Women, Crime and Language, Palgrave Macmillan London 2003
- Played in Britain: Modern Theatre in 100 Plays, with Kate Dorney, Bloomsbury Publishing 2013
