= 1976–77 British Home Championship =

Tournament details
- Dates: 28 May – 4 June 1977
- Teams: 4

Final positions
- Champions: Scotland (41st title)
- Runners-up: Wales

Tournament statistics
- Matches played: 6
- Goals scored: 12 (2 per match)
- Top scorer: (Scotland) Kenny Dalglish (3)

The 1976–77 British Home Championship launched a brand new era in Home Nations football during its final game, when jubilant Scottish fans invaded the pitch at Wembley Stadium following their team's 2–1 victory. Unlike a similar occasion in 1967, family football had given way to hooliganism and extensive damage was done to the stadium and riots in London throughout the night followed the occasion. It was events like this which eventually led to the tournament's cancellation in 1984.

The tournament itself was an open affair, with an opening victory for England cancelled out by a Scottish win over Northern Ireland and English defeat to Wales. The Welsh stood a good chance of winning the tournament outright for the first time since 1937, but could not beat the Irish in their final match, and ended up in a rare second-place position. The Scots and English thus faced each other in the final match knowing the winner would take the trophy, the Scots achieving a victory on England's home ground to take the trophy for the second year in a row and demonstrate their dominance in British football. The match was followed by a mass pitch invasion by Scottish supporters.

This tournament, as of 2025, is the most recent occasion when Wales defeated England away from home.

== Table ==
Team	Pld	W	D	L	GF	GA	GD	Pts
Scotland (C)	3	2	1	0	5	1	+4	5
Wales	3	1	2	0	2	1	+1	4
England	3	1	0	2	3	4	−1	2
Northern Ireland	3	0	1	2	2	6	−4	1

Rules for classification: 1) points. The points system worked as follows: 2 points for a win and 1 point for a draw.
(C) Champions

== Results ==
28 May 1977

Wales	0–0	Scotland
	Report (Page 24)

Racecourse Ground, Wrexham
Referee: Malcolm Moffatt (Northern Ireland)

28 May 1977

Northern Ireland	1–2	England
McGrath 4'	Report	Channon 27'; Tueart 86'

Windsor Park, Belfast
Referee: Brian McGinlay (Scotland)

31 May 1977

England	0–1	Wales
		James 44' (pen.)

Wembley Stadium, London
Referee: John Gordon (Scotland)

1 June 1977

Scotland	3–0	Northern Ireland
Dalglish 37', 79'; McQueen 61'	Report (Page 18)

Hampden Park, Glasgow
Referee: John Gow (Wales)

3 June 1977

Northern Ireland	1–1	Wales
Nelson 46'		Deacy 27'

Windsor Park, Belfast
Referee: Jack Taylor (England)

4 June 1977

England	1–2	Scotland
Channon 87' (pen.)	Report (Page 16)	McQueen 42'; Dalglish 60'

Wembley Stadium, London
Referee: Károly Palotai (Hungary)

== Goalscorers ==
3 goals

- (Scotland) Kenny Dalglish

2 goals

- (England) Mick Channon
- (Scotland) Gordon McQueen

1 goal

- (England) Dennis Tueart
- (Northern Ireland) Chris McGrath
- (Northern Ireland) Sammy Nelson
- (Wales) Nick Deacy
- (Wales) Leighton James
