= Mick Jones (footballer, born 1945) =

English footballer (born 1945)

Personal information
- Full name: Michael David Jones
- Date of birth: 24 April 1945 (age 81)
- Place of birth: Shireoaks, Nottinghamshire, England
- Height: 5 ft 10 1/4 in (1.78 m)
- Position: Centre forward

Youth career
- 1962–1963: Sheffield United

Senior career*
Years	Team	Apps	(Gls)
1963–1967	Sheffield United	149	(63)
1967–1975	Leeds United	220	(77)
Total		369	(140)

International career
1965–1970	England	3	(0)
- * Club domestic league appearances and goals

Michael David Jones (born 24 April 1945) is an English former footballer who played as centre forward with Leeds United during the 1960s and 1970s. He was also capped for England.

== Career ==
=== Sheffield United ===
Jones was spotted playing local league football for Dinnington Miners' Welfare, from where he went on to become an apprentice at Sheffield United in 1961. He graduated from the intermediate side through the Central League side before making his debut in a 1–1 draw against Manchester United at Old Trafford on 20 April 1963. He scored his first two league goals in the next fixture, a 3–1 victory against Manchester City at Maine Road four days later, on his 18th birthday. He made his England debut in 1965 against West Germany at centre forward.

Jones scored 63 goals in 149 appearances for the Blades, and had earned two caps for England when he joined Leeds United in September 1967 for £100,000, prompting the Sheffield United manager, John Harris, to remark "it would be the biggest mistake the club had ever made".

=== Leeds United ===
Leeds won the League Cup in his first season, although Jones did not feature in the campaign because he was cup-tied. Leeds also won the Fairs Cup, with Jones scoring twice during the competition, including what turned out to be the winner in the final against Ferencvaros. The first leg finished 1–0 thanks to Jones' goal and the second leg remained goalless to give Leeds the cup.

The following season Leeds won the League championship with Jones scoring 14 goals, and then joined by fellow striker Allan Clarke in 1969 to forge a strike partnership with Jones.

Leeds pursued a possible "treble" of League title, FA Cup and European Cup. Everton beat Leeds to the League title, and Celtic F.C. beat Leeds home and away in the European Cup semi-finals. In the FA Cup final against Chelsea at Wembley, the game was 1–1 on a bumpy, sandy pitch (due to the Horse of the Year show being held there the previous week). with fewer than ten minutes to play. Jones fired a left foot shot into the net beyond Peter Bonetti. Chelsea, however, equalised quickly so the contest went to a replay at Old Trafford. Leeds took the lead in the first half, when a run by Clarke set Jones on his way towards goal, and he hit right foot shot past Bonetti. Chelsea, however, ended up winning after extra time and Leeds ended the season trophyless.

In 1972, Leeds beat Arsenal 1–0 in the Centenary FA Cup Final with Jones setting up Clarke for the only goal of the game. However, Jones suffered a dislocated elbow in the last minute of the game after landing awkwardly from an innocuous and accidental clash with the Arsenal goalkeeper, Geoff Barnett. Jones was assisted by Norman Hunter, up to the Royal Box to collect his F.A. Cup winners medal. The injury however, meant Jones missed the League title decider away to Wolves just two days later which Wolves won 2–1. The defeat cost Leeds the Division 1 championship title to Derby County by a single point. Perhaps his finest performance of the 1971–72 season came on 19 February 1972, when he scored a hat-trick against Manchester United in a 5–1 league win at Elland Road.

In a 29-match unbeaten run at the start of the next season, Jones bagged 14 goals as Leeds won the title, but he was now beginning to have problems with one of his knees and spent the summer of 1974 having intensive physiotherapy. In early 1975, he began playing reserve football again, but in constant pain. Joe Jordan took the number nine shirt. The team (despite Revie's departure in the summer to take over the England job) reached its first European Cup final, Jones was a spectator who did not figure in the team all season. He watched as Leeds lost the European Cup final to Bayern Munich and then retired at the age of 30, unable to beat his knee problem. His Leeds career ended with 111 goals from 312 appearances. Allan Clarke, Jones' strike partner, admitted that it was never the same for him after Jones retired.

=== International career ===
Jones played three matches as a centre forward for England, all friendlies, between 1965 and 1970. He played his international debut on 12 May 1965, when he was aged 20, England beating West Germany 1–0. He played his second game for his country whilst still at Sheffield United in a 2–1 victory for England over Sweden at the Ullevi Stadium, Gothenburg on 16th May 1965. His third and last match for the Three Lions was on 14 January 1970, whilst at Leeds United, in a 0–0 draw with the Netherlands.

== Career statistics ==
Appearances and goals by club, season and competition
Club	Season	League			FA Cup		League Cup		Europe		Other		Total	
Club	Season	Division	Apps	Goals	Apps	Goals	Apps	Goals	Apps	Goals	Apps	Goals	Apps	Goals
Sheffield United	1962–63	First Division	6	4	0	0	0	0	–		–		6	4
Sheffield United	1963–64	First Division	23	5	3	3	0	0	–		2	0	28	8
Sheffield United	1964–65	First Division	39	14	3	3	1	0	–		–		43	17
Sheffield United	1965–66	First Division	40	21	1	0	1	0	–		1	1	43	22
Sheffield United	1966–67	First Division	33	15	4	3	4	1	–		2	2	43	21
Sheffield United	1967–68	First Division	8	4	0	0	1	0	–		–		9	4
Sheffield United	Total		149	63	11	9	7	1	–		5	3	172	76
Leeds United	1967–68	First Division	25	8	5	2	0	0	8 (Note: Appearances in Inter-Cities Fairs Cup)	2	–		38	12
Leeds United	1968–69	First Division	40	14	2	0	3	2	8	1	–		53	17
Leeds United	1969–70	First Division	32	15	9	3	3	0	8 (Note: Appearances in European Cup)	8	1 (Note: Appearance in FA Charity Shield)	0	53	26
Leeds United	1970–71	First Division	40	6	3	3	1	0	9	1	–		53	10
Leeds United	1971–72	First Division	24	11	5	2	1	0	0	0	–		30	13
Leeds United	1972–73	First Division	28	9	8	1	4	3	6 (Note: Appearances in European Cup Winners' Cup)	3	–		46	16
Leeds United	1973–74	First Division	31	14	4	1	1	0	3 (Note: Appearances in UEFA Cup)	2	–		39	17
Leeds United	Total		220	77	36	12	14	5	42	17	1	0	313	111
Total			369	140	47	21	21	6	42	17	6	3	485	187

== Honours ==
Leeds United

- Football League First Division: 1968–69, 1973–74
- FA Cup: 1971–72; runner-up: 1969–70, 1972–73
- Football League Cup: 1967–68
- FA Charity Shield: 1969
- Inter-Cities Fairs Cup: 1967–68, 1970–71; runner-up: 1966–67
- European Cup Winners' Cup runner-up: 1972–73

Individual

- European Cup top scorer: 1969–70
- Leeds United Player of the Year: 1973–74
