= Frances Gray (philosopher) =

Australian philosopher

Frances Marie Gray

Education
- Education: Monash University (Honours Degree in Arts), Australian National University (PhD in Philosophy and Women's Studies, 1996)
- Thesis: Essentialism and feminist theologies : some philosophical reflections (1996)
- Doctoral advisor: Penelope Deutscher

Philosophical work
- Era: 21st-century philosophy
- Region: Western philosophy
- Institutions: University of Queensland; University of New England (Australia)
- Main interests: analytical psychology, feminist philosophy, early modern philosophy

Frances Marie Gray is an Australian feminist philosopher, yoga practitioner, artist and gardener whose work connects analytical psychology, feminist philosophy, and early modern thought. She is an Honorary Research Fellow at the University of Queensland and a former lecturer at the University of New England (Australia). She has also taught at the Australian National University, University of Canberra and Monash University. Gray is known for her interpretations of Carl Jung and René Descartes, exploring how embodiment and subjectivity intersect in modern philosophy.

== Books ==
- Jung, Irigaray, Individuation: Analytical Psychology and the Question of the Feminine. Routledge, 2007.
- Cartesian Philosophy and the Flesh: Reflections on Incarnation in Analytical Psychology. Routledge, 2012.
- Jung and Levinas: An Ethics of Mediation. Routledge, 2016.
- Feminist Views from Somewhere: Post-Jungian themes in feminist theory, edited By Leslie Gardner and Frances Gray, Routledge, 2017.
