= Billy McGhie (footballer, born 1958) =

Scottish footballer

Personal information
- Full name: William Lambert McGhie
- Date of birth: 19 January 1958 (age 68)
- Place of birth: Lanark, Lanarkshire, Scotland
- Height: 5 ft 9 in (1.75 m)
- Position: Midfielder

Youth career
- –1976: Leeds United

Senior career*
| Years | Team | Apps | (Gls) |
| 1976–1979 | Leeds United | 2 | (1) |
| 1979–1981 | York City | 43 | (1) |
| 1981–???? | B 1903 | | |
| Total | | 45 | (1) |

International career
- Scotland Youth
- * Club domestic league appearances and goals

William Lambert McGhie (born 19 January 1958) is a Scottish former professional footballer who played as a winger in the Football League for Leeds United and York City and in Danish football for B 1903. He was a Scotland youth international.
