= Frank Gray (cricketer) =

English cricketer

Frank Gray (2 July 1873 – 23 February 1947) was an English cricketer who played for Leicestershire. He was born and died in Stoneygate, Leicester.

Gray made a single first-class appearance for the team, during the 1895 season, against Dublin University. Batting in the middle order, Gray scored 9 runs in the first innings in which he batted and 8 in the second.
