= Carl Harris =

Welsh footballer

Personal information
- Full name: Carl Stephen Harris
- Date of birth: 3 November 1956 (age 69)
- Place of birth: Neath, Wales
- Position: Winger

Senior career*
Years	Team	Apps	(Gls)
1973–1982	Leeds United	154	(26)
1982–1985	Charlton Athletic	76	(7)
1985–1987	Bury	38	(4)
1987	Airdrieonians	1	(0)
1988	Rochdale	25	(3)
1988–1989	Exeter City	16	(1)
1992–1994	Briton Ferry Athletic	68	(7)
1994	Ton Pentre	10	(1)
1994–1995	Maesteg Park	10	(0)
1995–1996	Afan Lido	54	(2)
1996	Ton Pentre	3	(0)
1996–1997	Carmarthen Town	26	(1)

International career
	Wales U23	1	(0)
1976–1982	Wales	24	(1)
- * Club domestic league appearances and goals

Carl Stephen Harris (born 3 November 1956 in Neath) is a Welsh former international footballer. As a winger, Harris was noted for his express pace. Former Ipswich Town and England captain Mick Mills is on record as saying Harris was the most difficult opponent he ever faced.

== Playing career ==
=== Leeds United ===
He was signed professionally for Leeds United in 1973 by Don Revie. Harris played under Jimmy Armfield and Jock Stein at Leeds and alongside Billy Bremner, Johnny Giles, Peter Lorimer, Norman Hunter, Allan Clarke, Paul Madeley, Paul Reaney and Eddie Gray.

A week after signing for Leeds, a young homesick Harris had returned to South Wales. However, Leeds thought he was worth pursuing and sent former player John Charles to persuade him to return. On 6 November 1974, Harris made his first team debut for Leeds, three days after his 18th birthday, in a European Cup second round tie at Elland Road v Hungarian champions Ujpest Dosza, coming on as a second-half substitute for Peter Lorimer in a 3–0 win. Five months later on 19 April 1975 Harris made his League debut, again coming on as a substitute, this time for Johnny Giles in a Division One match against Ipswich Town at Elland Road. Leeds went on to win that game 2–1, with Harris netting the winner. Harris reminisced,

It was brilliant to be honest. Trevor Cherry had equalised and I was on hand to win us the game. The Ipswich goalkeeper, Laurie Sivell, pushed Billy Bremner's shot away to his right and it looked like the ball was going out but I managed to get a left foot shot in which Sivell could only parry into his goal. It was right in front of the Kop and a great moment.

Harris went on to play 156 (30 of which were as a sub) league games for Leeds, scoring 26 league goals, including ending the 1980–81 season as the club's top scorer with 10 goals. Counting cup matches Harris played a total of 176 games (40 as sub) for the club, scoring 29 goals.

Following one game against Arsenal at Highbury, where Harris tormented the home side all afternoon, he was reportedly subject of £700,000 bid from the Gunners, in a time when 1 million pound transfers were still unusual.

Harris had been set to return to Leeds in 1985. Having played a few games for the Central League side to prove his fitness he was set to sign, but Leeds manager Eddie Gray was sacked and the deal fell through.

=== Later career ===
Out of contract, he finally left Elland Road in 1982 in a £100,000 move to Charlton Athletic. Following his move to London, Harris struggled with injuries but went on to play 76 times (7 goals) for Charlton, 38 games (4 goals) for Bury, 25 games (3 goals) for Rochdale and 16 games (1 goal) for Exeter City. In between leaving Bury and signing for Rochdale, Harris also turned out briefly for Airdrieonians, a club then managed by former Leeds teammate Gordon McQueen. Following his English League career Harris finished his playing days back in Neath as player-manager of local League of Wales side Briton Ferry Athletic before spending four years in the Welsh Premier League.

=== Wales ===
Harris won 24 full international caps and 1 under-23 cap (v Scotland) for Wales, all gained while at Leeds. Harris scored his only international goal in a 1–0 win against Turkey in a 1982 FIFA World Cup qualifying match. He made his full international debut in March 1976 against England at Wrexham, some eleven months after his club debut for Leeds. Harris picked up the last of his 24 caps in another game against England, at Cardiff in April 1982.
