= Gwyn Thomas (footballer) =

Welsh footballer (born 1957)

Personal information
- Full name: David Gwyn Thomas
- Date of birth: 26 September 1957 (age 69)
- Place of birth: Swansea, Wales
- Height: 5 ft 7 in (1.70 m)
- Position: Midfielder

Youth career
- West End
- Leeds United

Senior career*
Years	Team	Apps	(Gls)
1974–1984	Leeds United	89	(3)
1984–1990	Barnsley	201	(17)
1990–1991	Hull City	22	(0)
1991–1992	Carlisle United	37	(1)
Total		349	(21)

International career
	Wales U21	3	(0)
- * Club domestic league appearances and goals

David Gwyn Thomas (born 26 September 1957) is a Welsh former professional footballer who played as a midfielder.

== Career ==
After starting his career with West End in Swansea, he joined Leeds United, making his debut for the club as a substitute on 26 April 1975 away at Wolverhampton Wanderers. He made 103 appearances for Leeds before transferring to Barnsley in March 1984 for £40,000.

Thomas played 230 times in all competitions for Barnsley, breaking his leg in 1989, before joining Hull City for £25,000 in March 1990.

Thomas finished his career at Carlisle United in 1992.

== International career ==
Thomas made three appearances for Wales' U21 side. Thomas received a call-up to the senior Wales team, but he was forced to pull out due to injury.
