= Frank Gray =

Scottish footballer and manager

Personal information
- Full name: Francis Tierney Gray
- Date of birth: 27 October 1954 (age 72)
- Place of birth: Glasgow, Scotland
- Height: 5 ft 10 in (1.78 m)
- Position: Left-back

Youth career
- 1971–1973: Leeds United

Senior career*
| Years | Team | Apps | (Gls) |
| 1972–1979 | Leeds United | 193 | (17) |
| 1979–1981 | Nottingham Forest | 81 | (5) |
| 1981–1985 | Leeds United | 139 | (10) |
| 1985–1989 | Sunderland | 146 | (8) |
| 1989–1992 | Darlington | 85 | (8) |
| Total | | 644 | (48) |

International career
| 1976–1983 | Scotland | 32 | (1) |

Managerial career
- 1991–1992: Darlington
- 2005–2006: Farnborough Town
- 2006: Grays Athletic
- 2007–2008: Woking
- 2008–2012: Basingstoke Town
- 2012–2013: Bashley
- * Club domestic league appearances and goals

Francis Tierney Gray (born 27 October 1954) is a Scottish football manager and former player. He played for Leeds United, Nottingham Forest, Sunderland and Darlington, while he also represented Scotland 32 times. He managed Darlington, Farnborough Town, Grays Athletic, Woking, Basingstoke Town and Bashley.

== Club career ==
=== Leeds United ===
Gray was born in Glasgow and brought up in the city's Castlemilk district. He was one of the new generation of Leeds United players of the mid-1970s charged with the task of maintaining the club's success after the Don Revie era.

Gray, younger brother of Eddie, joined the club under Revie as a 17-year-old left-winger and made his debut in 1973, scoring a goal in his first start. Revie had lost regular left back Terry Cooper to a broken leg the year before and needed to find replacements, and Gray was given his chance as a left-back as a result.

He did not stay in the side, with a reshuffled defence allowing Trevor Cherry to take the left back spot for the end of the season which consisted of two cup finals (the FA Cup and the European Cup Winners Cup) both of which Leeds lost. Revie did invite Gray to travel with the squad to Wembley and he sat next to his manager during the defeat to Sunderland.

Gray was similarly spared regular football in the first team at such an early age the following year, with Cherry settled into the left back role. Leeds won the League championship thanks to an unbeaten start to the season of 29 games. Gray played only six times and did not qualify for a medal.

The following season, he made 18 appearances in the League and usurped Cherry for the No. 3 shirt in the European Cup final in Paris, which Leeds lost 2–0 to Bayern Munich. As the Revie team disbanded due to age – Revie himself had quit for the England manager's job the year before – Gray found himself tagged as one of the bright young things who would maintain the work of the previous team, alongside Gordon McQueen and Joe Jordan.

=== Nottingham Forest ===
In 1979, Gray joined Nottingham Forest for £500,000. Forest were managed by Brian Clough, who had previously managed Gray at Leeds.

Gray slotted into the team and played in his second European Cup final in 1980, making him the first player to appear in the final for two different English clubs. This time he was successful as Forest won 1–0 against a Hamburg SV side which included Kevin Keegan. Gray also finished on the losing side earlier in the season when Forest were beaten in the League Cup final by Wolves, thanks to a single goal from unrelated fellow Scotsman Andy Gray.

=== Return to Elland Road ===
Despite his success with Forest, in 1981 Gray returned to Leeds, accepting an invitation from manager – and former teammate – Allan Clarke. It was a £300,000 deal which took Gray back to Elland Road, but in the first season of his return Leeds were relegated.

Clarke was sacked by Leeds after relegation and Gray's brother Eddie took over. The younger Gray played for four years under his brother's stewardship but Leeds could not gain promotion and Gray left for Sunderland in 1985. His tally for Leeds stood up at 396 appearances and 35 goals.

== International career ==
Gray made his debut for Scotland in a 1–0 win over Switzerland in 1976, and won more caps in late 1978, having missed out on a place in the squad for that summer's World Cup in Argentina.

Gray was selected for Scotland's World Cup squad for the 1982 tournament in Spain, and he played in all three of the group games against New Zealand, Brazil and the USSR, though Scotland did not progress further.

His international career ended in 1983 after 32 appearances and one goal.

== Management career ==
During his second spell at Leeds, Gray coached Collingham Under 16s. After his second stint at Leeds, he helped Sunderland gain promotion from Division Three, then helped Darlington into the Football League as assistant to Brian Little in the 1990s and took Farnborough Town to the Nationwide Conference South play-offs in 2005–06. He moved to Grays Athletic with assistant Gerry Murphy to replace Mark Stimson, but his stay was short. He was brought to Woking by football technical director Colin Lippiatt in May 2007 with the aim of taking the club into the Football League.

Gray was appointed manager at Woking on 3 May 2007 on a two-year deal, replacing Glenn Cockerill. He departed by mutual consent on 8 April 2008.

He was appointed manager of Basingstoke Town in the Conference South, but he left the club through mutual consent, and was succeeded by academy manager Jason Bristow on a temporary contract until the end of the season.

Gray was appointed on 31 May 2012 as manager at Evostik Premier Division South club side Bashley. On 19 June 2013 Gray and his sideman Murphy stepped down and were replaced by former Bashley players Paul Gazzard and Stewart Kearn.

== Post-management career ==
Gray lives in Australia where he works as a pundit for Fox Sports Australia's Premier League coverage. In 2016, Gray worked in an advisory capacity for Manly United where he oversaw the Manly United junior programme and worked with women's teams across all grades.

== Family football links ==
His son Andy Gray, a striker, came through the ranks at Leeds and later played for Nottingham Forest, Bury, Preston, Oldham Athletic, Bradford City, Sheffield United, Sunderland, Burnley, Charlton Athletic and Barnsley. He also won two full international caps for Scotland.

His nephew Stuart represented Celtic and Reading as a full-back.

His grandsons, Archie Gray and Harry Gray are also professional footballers.

== Career statistics ==
=== International ===
Appearances and goals by national team and year
| National team | Year | Apps | Goals |
|---|---|---|---|
| Scotland | 1976 | 1 | 0 |
| Scotland | 1977 | 0 | 0 |
| Scotland | 1978 | 2 | 0 |
| Scotland | 1979 | 5 | 0 |
| Scotland | 1980 | 2 | 0 |
| Scotland | 1981 | 9 | 0 |
| Scotland | 1982 | 9 | 1 |
| Scotland | 1983 | 4 | 0 |
| Total | | 32 | 1 |

==== International goals ====
Scores and results list Scotland's goal tally first, score column indicates score after Gray goal.

International goal scored by Frank Gray
| # | Date | Venue | Opponent | Score | Result | Competition |
|---|---|---|---|---|---|---|
| 1. | 23 March 1982 | Hampden Park, Glasgow | Netherlands | 1–0 | 2–1 | Friendly |

== Honours ==
=== As a player ===
Leeds United

- Football League First Division: 1973–74
- European Cup runner-up: 1974–75
- European Cup Winners' Cup runner-up: 1972–73

Nottingham Forest

- European Cup: 1979–80
- European Super Cup: 1979
- Football League Cup runner-up: 1979–80
- Intercontinental Cup runner-up: 1980

Sunderland

- Football League Third Division: 1987–88

Darlington

- Football League Fourth Division: 1990–91
- Football Conference: 1989–90

== See also ==
- List of footballers in England by number of league appearances (500+)
- List of Leeds United F.C. players
- List of Scotland international footballers
- List of Scottish football families
