= Byron Stevenson =

Welsh footballer

Personal information
- Full name: William Byron Stevenson
- Date of birth: 7 September 1956
- Place of birth: Llanelli, Wales
- Date of death: 6 September 2007 (aged 50)
- Height: 6 ft 1 in (1.85 m)
- Positions: Defender; midfielder

Youth career
- 1972–1975: Leeds United

Senior career*
Years	Team	Apps	(Gls)
1975–1981	Leeds United	95	(4)
1981–1985	Birmingham City	74	(3)
1985–1986	Bristol Rovers	31	(3)

International career
1978–1982	Wales	15	(0)
- * Club domestic league appearances and goals

William Byron Stevenson (7 September 1956 – 6 September 2007) was a Welsh international footballer.

Stevenson played for Leeds United, Birmingham City and Bristol Rovers.

He started his career at Leeds United in 1972, who were then one of the forces in European club football. Originally thought of as a potential replacement for either Jack Charlton or Norman Hunter as the Don Revie Leeds team started to break up. Stevenson had to wait until April 1976 before he got anything like a run of games when he made six successive league appearances replacing Paul Reaney at right back. He had a good run at centre half in 1979 and in midfield in 1981 making a total of 95 appearances.

In 1981 a swap deal saw him move to Birmingham City where he played over 100 times. He joined Bristol Rovers in 1985, but decided to retire the following summer aged 29, after struggling with injuries.

Following his retirement from football, Byron became the landlord of the New Inn public house on Elland Road, Churwell, Leeds, which had been managed by another Leeds United and Wales international legend John Charles years earlier.

Stevenson died of throat cancer in September 2007—one day before what would have been his 51st birthday and one day after his grandson's birthday.

== International career ==
In May 1978 Stevenson made his Wales debut at the Racecourse, Wrexham in the 1–0 win over Northern Ireland in the British Championship. Stevenson played for his country 15 times between 1978 and 1982, adding to his Wales youth and U21 caps.

He was controversially sent off in Turkey in 1979 after he allegedly fractured opponent Buyak Mustafa's cheekbone. He was given a four-and-a-half year European ban, effectively ending his international career.
