= David Stewart (footballer, born 1947) =

Scottish footballer (1947–2018)

Personal information
- Full name: David Steel Stewart
- Date of birth: 11 March 1947
- Place of birth: Glasgow, Scotland
- Date of death: 13 November 2018 (aged 71)
- Position: Goalkeeper

Youth career
- Kilsyth Rangers

Senior career*
Years	Team	Apps	(Gls)
1967–1973	Ayr United	193	(0)
1973–1979	Leeds United	55	(0)
1979	West Bromwich Albion	0	(0)
1979–1981	Swansea City	57	(0)
- Ryoden
Total		305	(0)

International career
1977	Scotland	1	(0)
- * Club domestic league appearances and goals

David Steel Stewart (11 March 1947 – 13 November 2018) was a Scottish footballer, who played as a goalkeeper. After winning the Scottish Junior Cup with Kilsyth Rangers he was signed by Ally MacLeod's Ayr United for whom he played in two senior cup semi-finals. He then signed for Don Revie at Leeds United where he played when Leeds lost 2–0 to Bayern Munich in the 1975 European Cup Final. He signed for Ron Atkinson at West Bromwich Albion but didn't play for their first team. He then won promotion to the top flight of English football in his first season at John Toshack's Swansea City. Stewart saved a penalty in his one appearance for the Scotland national football team, a 1–0 defeat in East Germany in 1977.

== Early years ==
Stewart was born in Glasgow, and on leaving school trained to be an upholsterer and carpet fitter. He played football for local youth sides Wellshot, then Shettleston Violet, from where he joined Kilsyth Rangers of the Scottish Junior Football Association. The Kilsyth club were winners of the Scottish Junior Cup in 1967; They beat Rutherglen Glencairn 3–1 in a replayed final after initially drawing 1–1 at Hampden Park before 22,000 fans. Stewart, Drew Jarvie and Pat McMahon were all signed by professional clubs after the final.

== Ayr United ==
Aged 20, Stewart was signed by Ally MacLeod to join Ayr United in 1967. MacLeod had joined the year before and turned the previously modest Somerset Park club into a much respected side. Stewart, Dick Malone, Quinton Young and Johnny Doyle all played at Under-23 level for Scotland, while Alex Ingram played for the Scottish League. In 1969 Ayr were promoted as runners-up to Motherwell to the top tier of the then two division Scottish Football League set up. In that promotion season Ayr took Celtic to a replay in the 1968–69 Scottish League Cup. Ayr stayed in the top flight while Stewart was there culminating in a sixth-place finish in 1973, one place below Dundee F.C. whose fifth place qualified them for the 1973–74 UEFA Cup. In the 1972–73 Scottish Cup Ayr lost in the semi-final 2–0 to eventual winners, Rangers. He left in October 1973 with his time at Somerset Park overlapping that season with Alex Ferguson on the playing staff. He made 251 Ayr United first team appearances and in 2008 was the first goalkeeper to be inducted into the Ayr United Hall of Fame.

== Leeds United ==
Aged 26, he was signed for a £30,000 fee by Don Revie's Leeds United as a replacement for Gary Sprake and as understudy to David Harvey. Leeds won the First Division just after he joined in 1974, but he only contributed 3 appearances during the campaign. When Harvey was recovering from a car accident in 1975, Stewart was given a late season run in the first team. This meant Stewart played in the 1974–75 European Cup quarter-final win against Anderlecht. In the semi-final he gave what Leeds United report as his best performance for the club keeping Johan Cruyff and Johan Neeskens at bay to eliminate F.C. Barcelona. Leeds lost 2–0 in the final to Bayern Munich at the Parc de Princes in Paris. Despite Stewart being described by Leeds "as a brave and terrific shot-stopper" and as having made "inspirational saves" in the European run, Harvey became first choice on returning to fitness. Stewart's only other run of Leeds first team games was in 1977. He made 74 first team appearances for Leeds.

== West Bromwich Albion ==
Aged 31, in 1979 he signed mid-season for Ron Atkinson at West Bromwich Albion. He deputised to Tony Godden without playing for the first team. He left after 18 months in the 1980 close season.

== Swansea ==
Aged 33, he next signed for John Toshack at Swansea City. He was an ever-present in the league campaign in his first season winning promotion to the English top division. For the season after, Toshack then signed Dai Davies meaning Stewart again became back up goalkeeper. Stewart left Swansea in 1981 joining Ryoden in Hong Kong where he played for two years.

== Scotland ==
Stewart debuted for Scotland under-23s on 14 January 1970 when he was with Ayr. Two months before his 23rd birthday, this was his only cap at that level. Wales visited Pittodrie Park in Aberdeen for a 1–1 draw. John O'Hare then of Derby County scored for Scotland and later joined Stewart at Leeds United when Brian Clough was manager. Another Leeds player played beside Stewart in the under-23 game, Peter Lorimer.

Stewart received one full cap when selected by his ex-Ayr manager, Ally MacLeod to play against East Germany on 7 September 1977. Stewart saved a penalty in a 1–0 defeat at the Stadion der Weltjugend in East Berlin. Hartmut Schade scored the game's only goal in the 66th minute. Stewart's performance in Berlin was widely praised but on returning to the bench when back at Leeds, Stewart missed out on the squad for the 1978 FIFA World Cup in Argentina.

== Later years and death ==
After his playing days he returned to Swansea where worked in a carpet shop before becoming a goldsmith for 20 years. After retiring he returned to live in Kilsyth.

Stewart died on 13 November 2018, aged 71. He is survived by his wife Anne. They had no children.

== Honours ==
Kilsyth Rangers:

- Scottish Junior Cup 1967 – winner

Ayr United:

- 1968–69 Scottish Division Two – promotion
- Hall of Fame 2008 inductee

Leeds United:

- 1975 European Cup Final – runner up

Swansea City:

- 1980–81 Football League – Division Two promotion
