= Gordon McQueen =

Scottish footballer (1952–2023)

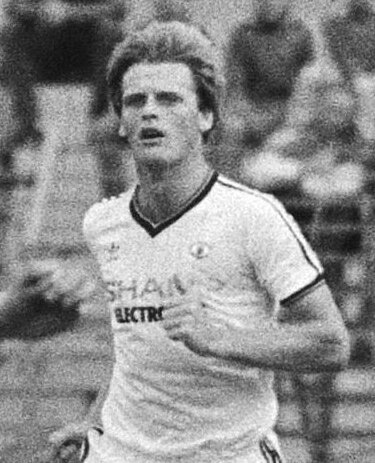
- McQueen playing for Manchester United in 1983

Personal information
- Full name: Gordon McQueen
- Date of birth: 26 June 1952
- Place of birth: Kilbirnie, Ayrshire, Scotland
- Date of death: 15 June 2023 (aged 70)
- Place of death: Hutton Rudby, North Yorkshire, England
- Height: 6 ft 3 in (1.91 m)
- Position: Defender

Senior career*
Years	Team	Apps	(Gls)
1970–1972	St Mirren	57	(5)
1972–1978	Leeds United	141	(15)
1978–1985	Manchester United	184	(20)
1985–1986	Seiko		
Total		381	(40)

International career
1974–1981	Scotland	30	(5)

Managerial career
- 1987–1989: Airdrieonians
- * Club domestic league appearances and goals

Gordon McQueen (26 June 1952 – 15 June 2023) was a Scottish professional footballer who played as a centre-back for St Mirren, Leeds United and Manchester United, in addition to the Scotland national team.

McQueen started his footballing career at St Mirren in 1970, but in 1972 was bought by Leeds for £30,000 to replace Jack Charlton. He was a central figure during the 1973–74 campaign, during which the Leeds team were undefeated for the first 29 matches and won the title. McQueen scored three times during the club's European Cup campaign the following season, but was suspended for the final, which Leeds lost. After a controversial move to Leeds' arch-rivals Manchester United, he won the 1983 FA Cup Final. McQueen joined Seiko in Hong Kong for one season in 1985, before retiring and moving into coaching; in that capacity, he managed Airdrieonians and St Mirren for periods in the 1980s.

McQueen played thirty times for Scotland, scoring five goals and winning the 1976–77 British Home Championship.

== Club career ==
McQueen was a goalkeeper (the position in which his father Tom had played professionally) as a schoolboy but later switched to centre-back. He was signed at the age of 18 by St Mirren from Ayrshire Junior team Largs Thistle. He soon had scouts from other clubs monitoring his progress and it was Leeds United who finally offered £30,000 (£360,000 today) in the 1972 close season, seeing him as a long-term replacement for the ageing Jack Charlton. Charlton played for some of the 1972–73 season but had decided to retire as the season was drawing to a close. McQueen played on six occasions in his first season at Leeds, including a substitute appearance in the 1973 European Cup Winners' Cup final, which Leeds lost to A.C. Milan.

With Charlton retired and Madeley playing in many positions, McQueen was in the team for most of the 1973–74 season. Leeds won the League Championship, with a run of 29 matches without a defeat from the start of the season with McQueen playing alongside Norman Hunter as Leeds' first-choice centre back pairing. Known for his heading, his 6 feet 3 inches (191 cm) stature and his stubborn attitude, McQueen played a significant role in the team's success. McQueen and Hunter excelled at the back the following season, notably in Leeds' campaign in the European Cup, during which McQueen scored three goals. He was suspended for the 1975 European Cup Final after being sent off in the semi-final versus Barcelona. Leeds went on to lose 2–0 in the final versus Bayern Munich.

In February 1978, McQueen moved from Leeds to their arch-rivals Manchester United for £500,000 (£2,700,000 today). On signing, he said that "99% of players want to play for Manchester United and the rest are liars." He had declared only weeks earlier in Shoot magazine that he wanted to stay at Elland Road for his entire career. He played in the 1979 FA Cup Final against Arsenal, scoring United's first of two goals in the 86th minute, but again finished on the losing side.

McQueen finally gained an FA Cup winner's medal in the 1983 FA Cup final, which United won after a replay versus Brighton & Hove Albion. Earlier that season he was also in the team defeated by Liverpool in the League Cup final, in which he was used as a centre-forward because he was injured and United had already made their only permitted substitution. He left Old Trafford in the 1985 close season, having suffered from persistent knee injuries. After one season with Seiko in the Hong Kong First Division, he retired from playing.

== International career ==
At the end of the 1973–74 season McQueen was called up to the Scotland squad and made his international debut versus Belgium. He was selected for the 1974 World Cup squad, but did not play. He soon became a regular for Scotland, and he captained the team and also scored his first international goal in a 1–1 draw against Romania on 1 June 1975. He achieved great success with Scotland in 1977, as he scored goals against Northern Ireland at Hampden then England at Wembley as the Scots won the British Home Championship and later that year he helped the team qualify for the 1978 World Cup by beating Wales at Anfield. Although he was selected for the 1978 World Cup squad, he could not play due to injury. McQueen played his last match for Scotland in 1981, having gained thirty caps and scored five goals.

== Post-playing career ==
McQueen coached abroad before managing Airdrieonians from 1987 to 1989, before coaching at his first club St Mirren. When McQueen's friend and former team-mate Bryan Robson was appointed the manager of Middlesbrough, McQueen joined him as reserve-team coach. He held this position for five years, and was then a first-team coach for two years. McQueen left the Teesside club in June 2001, following the departure of Robson and the appointment of Steve McClaren. McQueen then joined Sky Sports as a pundit, working on their Soccer Saturday results show.

On 29 April 2008, McQueen returned to Middlesbrough as assistant scout, alongside David Mills.

== Personal life ==
After coaching Middlesbrough, McQueen and his wife lived in the village of Hutton Rudby, North Yorkshire. The couple had a son and two daughters, including Hayley, who is a sports journalist. Politically, McQueen was a Labour supporter.

In October 2011, McQueen was diagnosed with laryngeal cancer and started treatment at the James Cook University Hospital, Middlesbrough. In January 2021, he was diagnosed with vascular dementia. This highlighted the issue of injuries caused to footballers by persistent heading of a ball. He died from complications caused by a combination of vascular dementia and chronic traumatic encephalopathy (CTE) at home on 15 June 2023, at the age of 70. In January 2026, an inquest into McQueen's death ruled that "It is likely that repetitive head impacts sustained by heading the ball while playing football contributed to the CTE".

== Career statistics ==
Appearances and goals by national team and year
National team	Year	Apps	Goals
Scotland	1974	2	0
Scotland	1975	7	1
Scotland	1976	2	0
Scotland	1977	6	2
Scotland	1978	6	1
Scotland	1979	6	1
Scotland	1980	–	
Scotland	1981	1	0
Total		30	5

Scores and results list Scotland's goal tally first, score column indicates score after each goal.

List of international goals scored
No.	Date	Venue	Opponent	Score	Result	Competition
1	1 June 1975	Stadionul 23 August, Bucharest	Romania	1–1	1–1	UEFA Euro 1976 qualifying
2	1 June 1977	Hampden Park, Glasgow	Northern Ireland	3–0	3–0	1976–77 British Home Championship
3	4 June 1977	Wembley Stadium, London	England	1–0	2–1	1976–77 British Home Championship
4	20 September 1978	Praterstadion, Vienna	Austria	1–3	2–3	UEFA Euro 1980 qualifying
5	7 June 1979	Ullevaal Stadion, Oslo	Norway	4–0	4–0	UEFA Euro 1980 qualifying

== Honours ==
Leeds United

- Football League First Division: 1973–74
- European Cup runner-up: 1974–75
- European Cup Winner's Cup runner-up: 1972–73

Manchester United

- FA Cup: 1982–83; runner-up: 1978–79
- FA Charity Shield: 1983
- Football League Cup runner-up: 1982–83

Individual

- PFA Team of the Year: 1974–75 First Division, 1977–78 First Division
- Leeds United Player of the Year: 1974–75, 1976–77
- Scottish Football Hall of Fame: 2012

== See also ==
- List of Scotland national football team captains
- List of Scottish football families
