= David Harvey (footballer) =

Scotland international football goalkeeper

Personal information
- Full name: David Harvey
- Date of birth: 7 February 1948 (age 78)
- Place of birth: Leeds, England
- Height: 5 ft 11 in (1.80 m)
- Position: Goalkeeper

Youth career
- 1963–1965: Leeds United

Senior career*
Years	Team	Apps	(Gls)
1965–1980	Leeds United	276	(0)
1980	Vancouver Whitecaps	10	(0)
1980–1981	Leeds United	0	(0)
1981	→ Drogheda United (loan)	?	(0)
1981–1982	Vancouver Whitecaps	9	(0)
1982–1985	Leeds United	73	(0)
1985	Partick Thistle	1	(0)
1985	Bradford City	6	(0)
1985–1986	Whitby Town		
1986	Morton	3	(0)
1987	Harrogate Town		
Total		379	(0)

International career
1972–1976	Scotland	16	(0)

Managerial career
- 1985–1986: Whitby Town
- * Club domestic league appearances and goals

David Harvey (born 7 February 1948) is a former footballer who played as a goalkeeper. Harvey is best known for his 19-year playing career with Leeds United, during which he made over 400 first team appearances. With Leeds he won the 1972 FA Cup final and the league championship in 1974. He was a runner-up in three other senior cup finals with Leeds. Harvey gained 16 international caps for Scotland between 1972 and 1976. This included three appearances at the 1974 FIFA World Cup, for which he was voted as goalkeeper of the tournament.

== Playing career ==
=== Leeds United ===
Born in Leeds, West Riding of Yorkshire in 1948, Harvey attended Foxwood School (in the Seacroft area of Leeds), and played for Leeds City Boys before leaving school to work in a Stylo shoe factory. He was signed as a professional footballer by Don Revie in February 1965, after having played as an apprentice for two years.

Harvey was the reserve goalkeeper for Leeds United during the late 1960s and early 1970s, and was on the reserves' bench when Leeds won the League Cup and the Fairs Cup in 1968, the League championship in 1969, and the Fairs Cup in 1971. Though he did play four times in each of the two Fairs Cup trophy winning seasons.

In the 1970 FA Cup Final, an error by first-choice goalkeeper Gary Sprake allowed opponents Chelsea to equalise in the first half. Sprake was blameless for the second equaliser, but Harvey replaced him for the replay, which Leeds lost 2–1.

In the 1971–72 season, Harvey played only eleven matches, but was selected ahead of Sprake for the 1972 FA Cup Final against Arsenal, as Sprake was suffering from a knee injury. Leeds won 1–0 with an Allan Clarke goal, and from that point on Harvey was the first-choice goalkeeper.

Harvey played 63 times in the 1972–73 season, and played in both the FA Cup Final and the European Cup Winners Cup Final – ending up on the losing side both times.

Leeds put together a 29-match unbeaten start to the 1973–74 season, winning the League championship and earning Harvey the title medal to which he had not been entitled five seasons earlier.

At the start of the 1974–75 season, Harvey took the last penalty during the shoot-out at the Charity Shield game against Liverpool but missed, thus allowing Liverpool to carry the trophy home. Later in the season Harvey was injured in a car crash. He missed the rest of the season replaced by his understudy David Stewart. Stewart was praised for his bravery and "inspirational saves" beating Anderlecht and F.C. Barcelona in the 1974–75 European Cup. Leeds were beaten 2–0 by Bayern Munich in the final in Paris.

The rest of the 1970s saw Leeds decline after the ageing team Revie built broke up. Harvey left in 1980.

=== Vancouver Whitecaps ===
Harvey moved to NASL club Vancouver Whitecaps in 1980. He had an unsteady first season with Vancouver, and even though his form improved in the second season in the NASL, but major injuries from another car accident prevented him from regaining his form and place.

=== Return to Leeds United ===
Harvey returned to Leeds in 1983, by which time the club had been relegated to the old Second Division. By the time he left in 1985, he had played under three of his old teammates: Allan Clarke, Eddie Gray and Billy Bremner. Harvey made over 400 career first team appearances for Leeds.

=== Later career ===
Harvey played 6 league games for Bradford City in 1985. This was under the management of an ex-Leeds teammate, Trevor Cherry. He then played 3 league games in Scotland for Morton in 1986. He next played non-league football with Whitby Town and Harrogate Town before his retirement from the game aged 37.

=== International career ===
Harvey made his debut for Scotland in a 2–0 win over Denmark, selected through his Ayrshire raised father. In his 16 full caps he was part of eight victories, four draws and four defeats. He was selected as Scotland's first-choice goalkeeper for the 1974 FIFA World Cup in West Germany. Harvey only conceded one goal in three games played, but Scotland were eliminated on goal difference after a 2–0 win against Zaire and draws with Brazil (0–0) and Yugoslavia (1–1).

== Honours ==
Leeds United

- Football League First Division: 1973–74
- FA Cup: 1971–72; runner-up: 1969–70, 1972–73
- Inter-Cities Fairs Cup: 1967–68, 1970–71
- UEFA Cup Winners' Cup runner-up: 1972–73

Scotland

- British Home Championship: 1973–74 (shared)

== Life after football ==
He retired from football at the age of 37 years. He managed a public house at Stamford Bridge, near York. He then became a postman, saying, "The sorting office atmosphere was like a dressing room".

In 1994, with his second wife, June (and their five children), he bought a 150-year-old stone cottage with 10 acres of farmland on Sanday in Orkney. He again worked as a postman. On 24 December 2009, he suffered a heart attack, from which he recovered.

In July 2020 Harvey relocated to Lochmaben near Dumfries for greater accessibility to his grandchildren in comparison to Orkney.

== See also ==
- List of Scotland international footballers born outside Scotland
