= Bobby Charlton =

English footballer (1937–2023)

Sir Bobby Charlton CBE
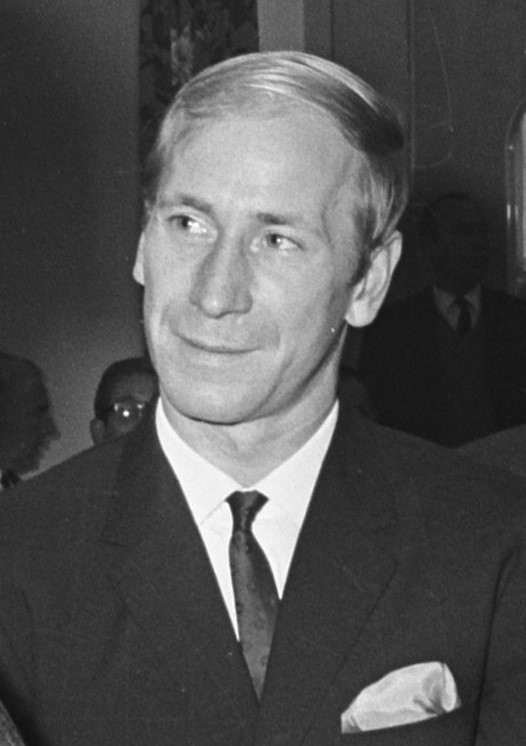
- Charlton in 1966

Personal information
- Full name: Robert Charlton
- Date of birth: 11 October 1937
- Place of birth: Ashington, Northumberland, England
- Date of death: 21 October 2023 (aged 86)
- Place of death: Macclesfield, Cheshire, England
- Height: 5 ft 8 in (1.73 m)
- Positions: Midfielder; forward

Youth career
- East Northumberland Schools
- 1953–1956: Manchester United

Senior career*
Years	Team	Apps	(Gls)
1956–1973	Manchester United	606	(199)
1974–1975	Preston North End	38	(8)
1976	Waterford	3	(1)
1978	Newcastle KB United	1	(0)
1980	Perth Azzurri	3	(2)
1980	Blacktown City	1	(1)
Total		652	(211)

International career
1953	England Schoolboys	4	(5)
1954	England Youth	1	(1)
1958–1960	England U23	6	(5)
1958–1970	England	106	(49)

Managerial career
- 1973–1975: Preston North End
- 1983: Wigan Athletic (caretaker)
Medal record
Men's football
Representing England
FIFA World Cup
Winner	1966
UEFA European Championship
Third place	1968
- * Club domestic league appearances and goals

Sir Robert Charlton (11 October 1937 – 21 October 2023) was an English footballer who played as an attacking midfielder, left winger or centre-forward. Widely considered one of the greatest players of all time, he was a member of the England team that won the 1966 FIFA World Cup, the year he also won the Ballon d'Or. He finished second in the Ballon d'Or voting in 1967 and 1968. He played almost all of his club football at Manchester United, where he became renowned for his attacking instincts, passing abilities from midfield, ferocious long-range shooting from both left and right foot, fitness, and stamina. He was cautioned only twice in his career: once against Argentina in the 1966 World Cup, and once in a league match against Chelsea. With success at club and international level, he was one of eleven players to have won the FIFA World Cup, the European Cup and the Ballon d'Or. His elder brother Jack, who was also in the World Cup–winning team, was a defender for Leeds United and also for ten years was the manager of the Republic of Ireland.

Born in Ashington, Northumberland, Charlton made his debut for the Manchester United first-team in 1956, at 18, and soon gained a regular place in the team, during which he became a Football League First Division champion in 1957 then survived the Munich air disaster of February 1958 after being rescued by teammate Harry Gregg; Charlton was the last survivor of the plane crash from the club. After helping United to win the FA Cup in 1963 and the Football League in 1965 and 1967, he captained the team that won the European Cup in 1968, scoring two goals in the final to help them become the first English club to win the competition. Charlton left Manchester United to become manager of Preston North End for the 1973–74 season. He changed to player-manager the following season. He next accepted a post as a director with Wigan Athletic, then became a member of Manchester United's board of directors in 1984.

At international level, Charlton was named in the England squad for four World Cups (1958, 1962, 1966, and 1970), though he did not play in the first. At the time of his retirement from the England team in 1970, he was the nation's most capped player, having turned out 106 times at the highest level; Bobby Moore overtook this in 1973. Charlton was the long-time record goalscorer for both Manchester United and England, and United's long-time record appearance maker – his total of 758 matches for United took until 2008 to be beaten, when Ryan Giggs did so in that year's Champions League final. With 249 goals, he was the club's highest all-time goalscorer for more than 40 years, until his record was surpassed by Wayne Rooney in 2017. He is also the third-highest goalscorer for England; his record of 49 goals was beaten in 2015 by Rooney, and again by Harry Kane in 2022.

Overall, he made over 1,000 appearances in his career.

== Early life ==
Robert Charlton was born on 11 October 1937 in Ashington, Northumberland, England, to coal miner Robert "Bob" Charlton (24 May 1909 – April 1982) and Elizabeth Ellen "Cissie" Charlton (née Milburn; 11 November 1912 – 25 March 1996). He was related to several professional footballers on his mother's side of the family: his uncles were Jack Milburn (Leeds United and Bradford City), George Milburn (Leeds United and Chesterfield), Jim Milburn (Leeds United and Bradford Park Avenue) and Stan Milburn (Chesterfield, Leicester City and Rochdale), and legendary Newcastle United and England footballer Jackie Milburn was his mother's cousin. However, Charlton credited much of the early development of his career to his grandfather Tanner and his mother Cissie. His elder brother, Jack, initially worked as a miner before applying to the police, only to also become a professional footballer with Leeds United.

== Club career ==
On 9 February 1953, then a Bedlington Grammar School pupil, Charlton was spotted playing for East Northumberland schools by Manchester United chief scout Joe Armstrong. Charlton went on to play for England Schoolboys and the 15-year-old signed amateur forms with United on 1 January 1953 along with Wilf McGuinness, also aged 15. Initially his mother was reluctant to let him commit to an insecure football career, so he began an apprenticeship as an electrical engineer; however, he went on to turn professional in October 1954.

Charlton became one of the famed Busby Babes, the collection of talented footballers who emerged through the system at Old Trafford in the 1940s, 1950s and 1960s as Matt Busby set about a long-term plan of rebuilding the club after the Second World War. He worked his way through the pecking order of teams, scoring regularly for the youth and reserve sides before he was handed his first team debut against Charlton Athletic in October 1956 where he scored two goals in a game that finished 4–2. At the same time, he was doing his National service with the Royal Army Ordnance Corps in Shrewsbury, where Busby had advised him to apply as it meant he could still play for Manchester United at the weekend. Also doing his army service in Shrewsbury at the same time was his United teammate Duncan Edwards.

Charlton played 17 times for United in that first season, scoring twice on his debut and managing a total of 12 goals in all competitions, and including a hat-trick in a 5–1 away win over Charlton Athletic in February. United won the league championship but were denied the 20th century's first "double" when they controversially lost the 1957 FA Cup Final to Aston Villa. Charlton, still only 19, was selected for the game, which saw United goalkeeper Ray Wood carried off with a broken cheekbone after a clash with Villa centre forward Peter McParland. Charlton was a candidate to go in goal to replace Wood (in the days before substitutes, and certainly before goalkeeping substitutes), but it was teammate Jackie Blanchflower who ended up playing in goal.

Charlton was an established player by the time the next season was fully underway, which saw United, as current League champions, become the first English team to compete in the European Cup. Previously, the Football Association had scorned the competition, but United made progress, reaching the semi-finals where they lost to holders Real Madrid. Their reputation was further enhanced the next season in the 1957–58 European Cup as they reached the quarter-finals to play Red Star Belgrade. In the first leg at home, United won 2–1. The return in Yugoslavia saw Charlton score twice as United stormed 3–0 ahead, although the hosts came back to earn a 3–3 draw. However, United maintained their aggregate lead to reach the last four and were in jubilant mood as they left to catch their flight home, thinking of an important League game against Wolves at the weekend.

=== 1958 Munich air disaster ===
On 6 February 1958, Charlton was returning to England with the Manchester United Team after a European Cup match in Belgrade, Yugoslavia (now Serbia), having eliminated Red Star Belgrade to advance to the semi-finals of the competition. The aeroplane which took the United players and staff home from Zemun Airport needed to stop in Munich to refuel. This was carried out in worsening weather, and by the time the refuelling was complete and the call was made for the passengers to re-board the aircraft, the wintry showers had taken hold and snow had settled heavily on the runway and around the airport. There were two aborted take-offs which led to concern on board, and the passengers were advised by a stewardess to disembark again while a minor technical error was fixed.

The team were back in the airport terminal for barely ten minutes when the call came to reconvene on the plane, and a number of passengers began to feel nervous. Charlton and teammate Dennis Viollet swapped places with Tommy Taylor and David Pegg, who had decided they would be safer at the back of the plane.

The plane clipped the fence at the end of the runway on its next take-off attempt and a wing tore through a nearby house, setting it alight. The wing and part of the tail came off and hit a tree and a wooden hut, the plane spinning along the snow until coming to a halt. It had been cut in half.

Charlton, strapped into his seat, had fallen out of the cabin; when United goalkeeper Harry Gregg (who had somehow got through a hole in the plane unscathed and begun a one-man rescue mission) found him, he thought he was dead. Nevertheless, he grabbed both Charlton and Viollet by their trouser waistbands and dragged them away from the plane, in constant fear that it would explode. Gregg returned to the plane to try to help the appallingly injured Busby and Blanchflower, and when he turned around again, he was relieved to see that Charlton and Viollet, both of whom he had presumed to be dead, had got out of their detached seats and were looking into the wreckage.

Charlton suffered cuts to his head and severe shock, and was in hospital for a week. Seven of his teammates had perished at the scene, including Taylor and Pegg, with whom he and Viollet had swapped seats prior to the fatal take-off attempt. Club captain Roger Byrne was also killed, along with Mark Jones, Billy Whelan, Eddie Colman and Geoff Bent. Duncan Edwards died a fortnight later from the injuries he had sustained. In total, the crash claimed 23 lives. Initially, ice on the wings was blamed, but a later inquiry declared that slush on the runway had made a safe take-off almost impossible.

Of the 44 passengers and crew (including the 17-strong Manchester United squad), 23 people (eight of them Manchester United players) died as a result of their injuries in the crash. Charlton survived with minor injuries. Of the eight other players who survived, two of them were injured so badly that they never played again.

Charlton was the first injured survivor to leave hospital. Harry Gregg and Bill Foulkes were not hospitalised, for they escaped uninjured. He arrived back in England on 14 February 1958, eight days after the crash. As he convalesced with family in Ashington, he spent some time kicking a ball around with local youths, and a famous photograph of him was taken. He was still only 20 years old, yet now there was an expectation that he would help with the rebuilding of the club as Busby's aides tried to piece together what remained of the season.

Between Harry Gregg's death in 2020 and his own in 2023, Charlton was the last living survivor of the crash.

=== Resuming his career ===
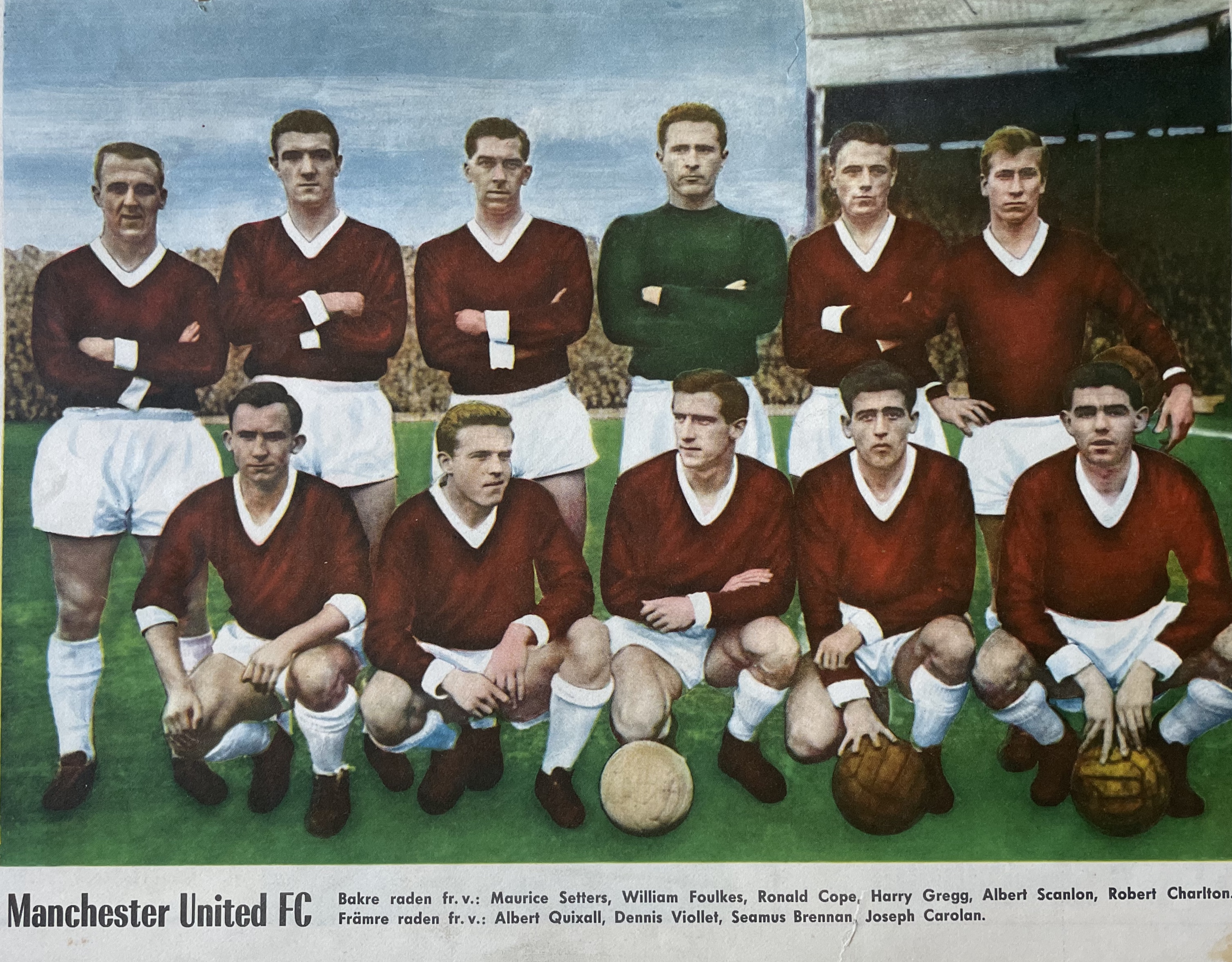
An illustration of the Manchester United team in 1960 (Charlton is on the far right of the back row)

Charlton returned to playing in a kickabout with local youths first and then in a practice match on 25 February. He initially said "I felt as slow as an old cart horse" but then his vigour returned and he then said "I feel fine and would like to play in the cup game at West Brom". This was an FA Cup tie against West Bromwich Albion on 1 March; the game was a draw and United won the replay 1–0. Not unexpectedly, United went out of the European Cup to A.C. Milan in the semi-finals to a 5–2 aggregate defeat and fell behind in the League. Yet somehow they reached their second consecutive FA Cup final, and the big day at Wembley coincided with Busby's return to work. However, Nat Lofthouse scored twice to give Bolton Wanderers a 2–0 win.

Further success with Manchester United came at last when they beat Leicester City 3–1 in the FA Cup final of 1963, with Charlton finally earning a winners' medal in his third final. Busby's post-Munich rebuilding programme continued to progress, with two League championships within three seasons, in 1965 and 1967. A successful (though trophyless) season with Manchester United saw him take the honours of Football Writers' Association Footballer of the Year and European Footballer of the Year into the competition.

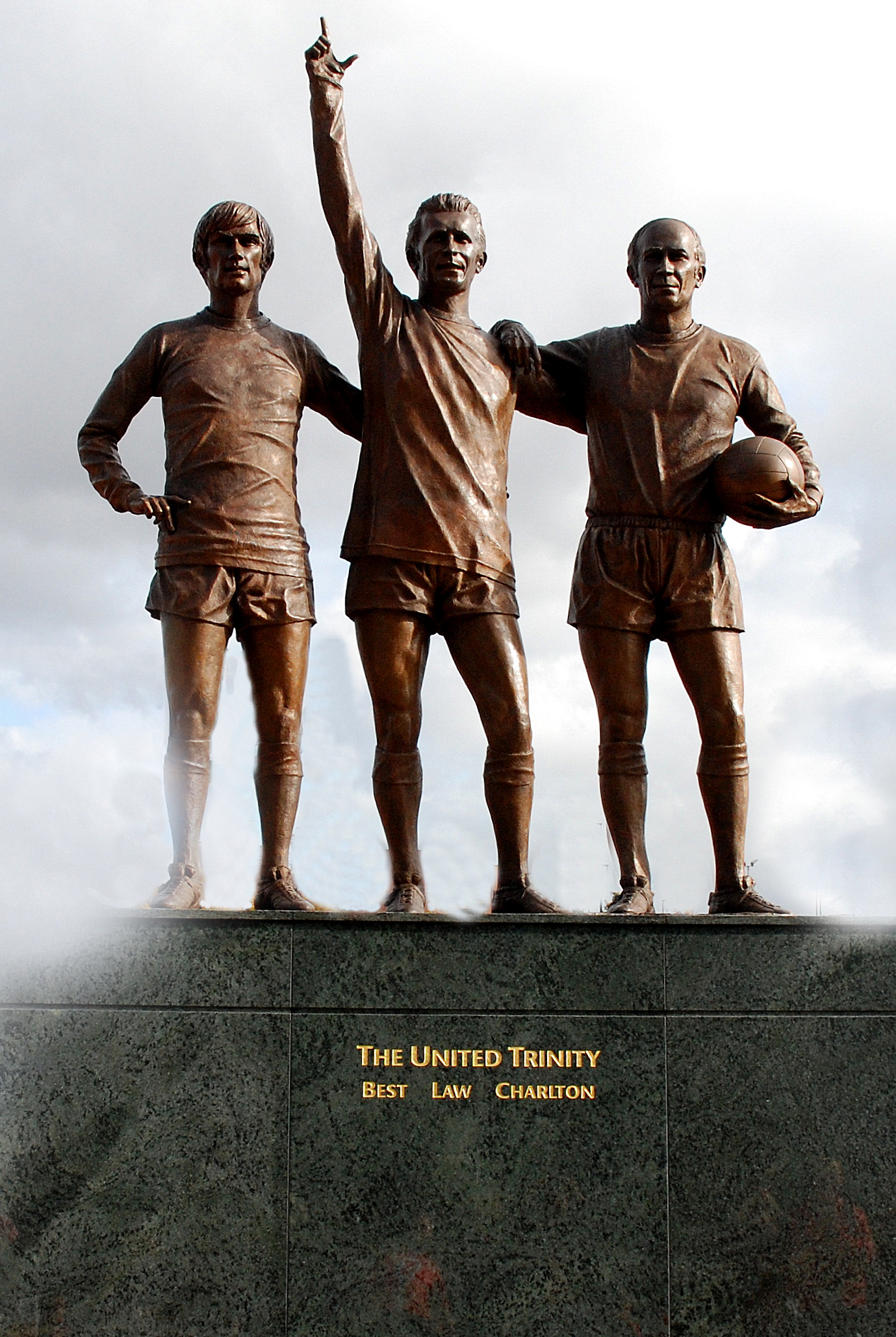
The "United Trinity" statue of Charlton (right) alongside Denis Law (centre) and George Best (left) outside Old Trafford

Manchester United reached the 1968 European Cup Final, ten seasons after Munich. Even though other clubs had taken part in the competition in the intervening decade, the team which got to this final was still the first English side to do so. On a highly emotional night at Wembley, Charlton scored twice in a 4–1 win after extra time against Benfica and, as United captain, lifted the trophy.

During the early 1970s, Manchester United were no longer competing among the top teams in England, and at several stages were battling against relegation. At times, Charlton was not on speaking terms with United's other superstars, George Best and Denis Law, and Best refused to play in Charlton's testimonial match against Celtic, saying that "to do so would be hypocritical". Charlton left Manchester United at the end of the 1972–73 season, having scored 249 goals and set a club record of 758 appearances, a record which Ryan Giggs broke in the 2008 UEFA Champions League Final.

Charlton's last game for Manchester United was against Chelsea at Stamford Bridge on 28 April 1973. Chelsea won the match 1–0. Coincidentally, this day also marked his brother Jackie's last appearance as well (for Leeds). Charlton's final goal for the club came a month earlier, on 31 March, in a 2–0 win at Southampton, also in the First Division.

Charlton was the subject of an episode of This Is Your Life in 1969 when he was surprised by Eamonn Andrews at The Sportsman's Club in central London.

== International career ==
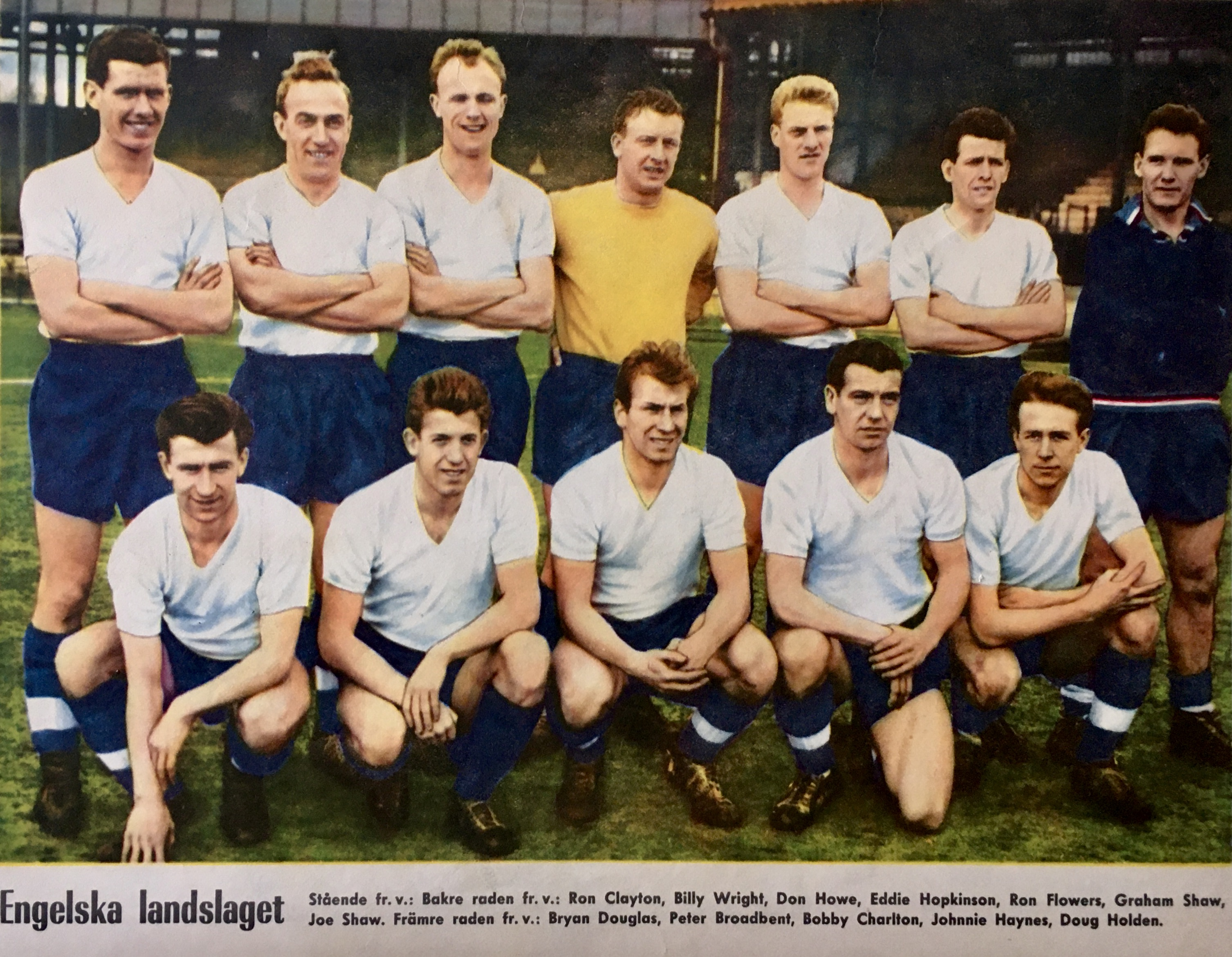
England national football team at Empire Stadium, London 11 April 1959. From the left, standing: Ronnie Clayton, Billy Wright (captain), Don Howe, Eddie Hopkinson, Ron Flowers, Graham Shaw, Joe Shaw; front row: Bryan Douglas, Peter Broadbent, Bobby Charlton, Johnny Haynes and Doug Holden.

Charlton's emergence as the country's leading young football talent was completed when he was called up to join the England squad for a British Home Championship game against Scotland at Hampden Park on 19 April 1958, just over two months after he had survived the Munich air disaster.

Charlton was handed his debut as England romped home 4–0, with the new player gaining even more admirers after scoring a magnificent thumping volley dispatched with authority after a cross by the left winger Tom Finney. He scored both goals in his second game as England beat Portugal 2–1 in a friendly at Wembley, and overcame obvious nerves on a return to Belgrade to play his third match against Yugoslavia; England lost that game 5–0 and Charlton played poorly.

Charlton was selected for the squad which competed at the 1958 World Cup in Sweden, but he did not play.

In 1959, Charlton scored a hat-trick as England demolished the US 8–1; and his second England hat-trick came in 1961 in an 8–0 thrashing of Mexico. He also managed to score in every British Home Championship tournament he played in except 1963 in an association with the tournament that lasted from 1958 to 1970 and included 16 goals and 10 tournament victories (five shared).

=== 1962 World Cup ===
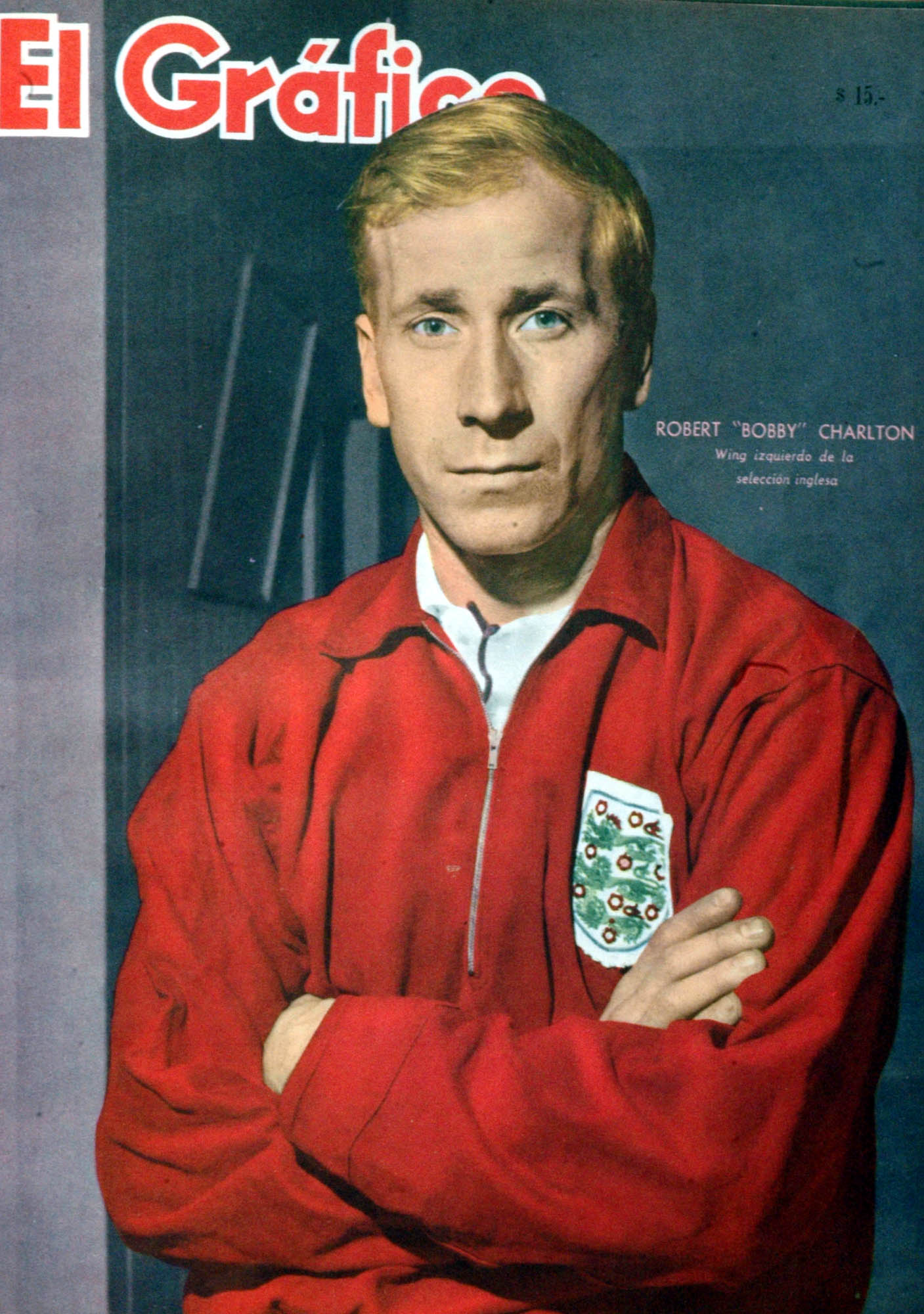
Charlton on the cover of the Argentine sports magazine El Gráfico, 27 June 1962

Charlton played in qualifiers for the 1962 World Cup in Chile against Luxembourg and Portugal and was named in the squad for the finals themselves. His goal in the 3–1 group win over Argentina was his 25th for England in just 38 appearances, and he was still only 24 years old; but his individual success could not be replicated by that of the team, which was eliminated in the quarter-final by Brazil, who went on to win the tournament.

By now, England were coached by Alf Ramsey, who had managed to gain sole control of the recruitment and team selection procedure from the committee-based call-up system which had lasted up to the previous World Cup. Ramsey had already cleared out some of the older players who had been reliant on the loyalty of the committee for their continued selection. A hat-trick in the 8–1 rout of Switzerland in June 1963 took Charlton's England goal tally to 30, equalling the record jointly held by Tom Finney and Nat Lofthouse; Charlton's 31st goal, against Wales in October the same year, gave him the record alone.

Charlton's role was developing from traditional inside-forward to what today would be termed an attacking midfield player, with Ramsey planning to build the team for the 1966 World Cup around him. When England beat the USA 10–0 in a friendly on 27 May 1964, he scored one goal, his 33rd at senior level for England.

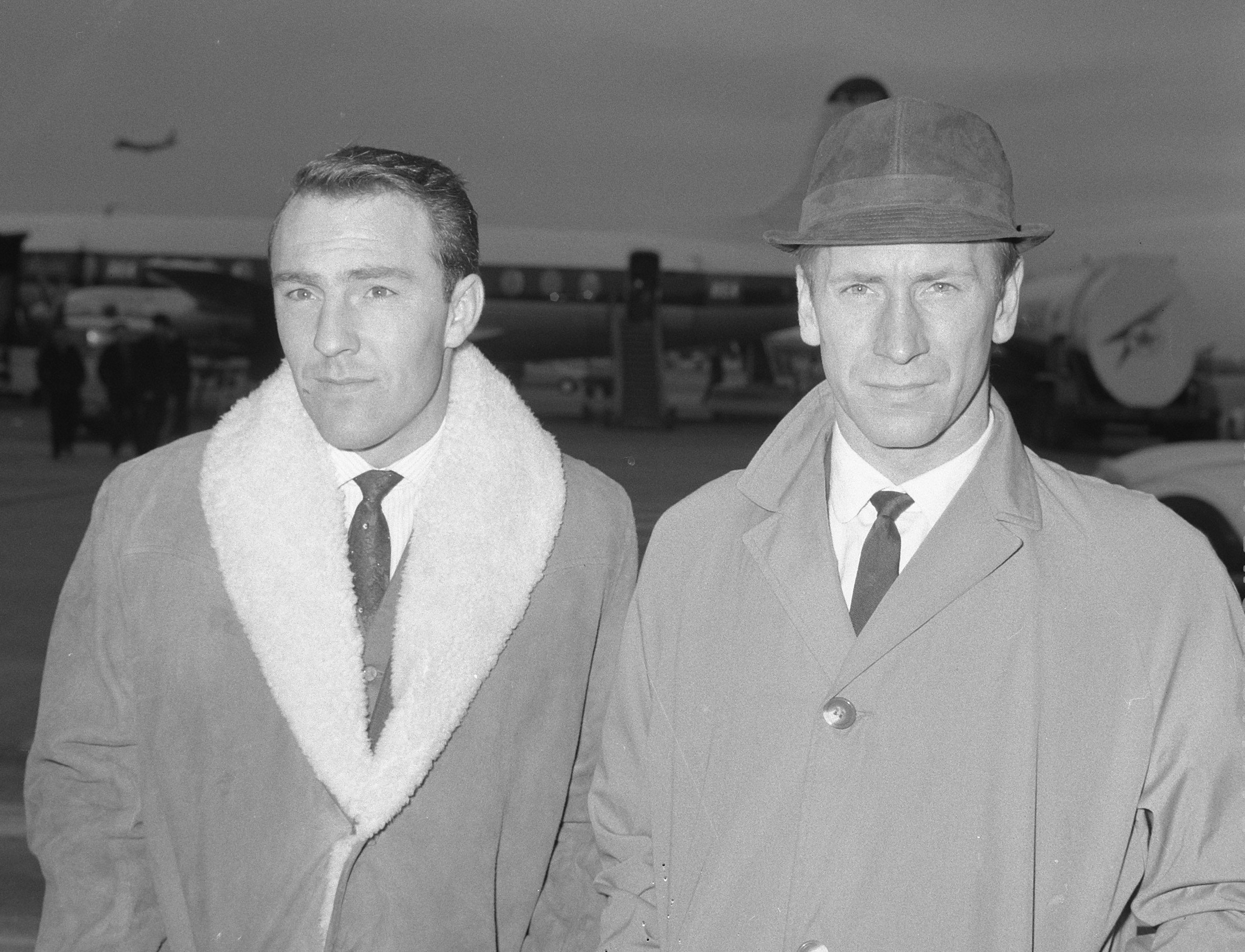
Jimmy Greaves and Bobby Charlton, December 1964

His goals became a little less frequent, and indeed Jimmy Greaves, playing purely as a striker, overtook his England tally in October 1964. Nevertheless, Charlton was still scoring and creating freely, and as the tournament was about to start he was expected to become one of its stars and galvanise his established reputation as one of the world's best footballers.

=== 1966 World Cup ===
England drew the opening game of the tournament 0–0 with Uruguay. Charlton scored the first goal in the 2–0 win over Mexico. This was followed by an identical scoreline against France, allowing England to qualify for the quarter-finals, where they defeated Argentina 1–0. The game was the only international match in which Charlton received a caution.

They faced Portugal in the semi-finals. This turned out to be one of Charlton's most important games for England. Charlton opened the scoring with a crisp side-footed finish after a run by Roger Hunt had forced the Portuguese goalkeeper out of his net; his second was a sweetly struck shot after a run and pull-back from Geoff Hurst. Charlton and Hunt were now England's joint-highest scorers in the tournament with three each, and a final against West Germany beckoned.

The final turned out to be one of Charlton's quieter days; he and a young Franz Beckenbauer effectively marked each other out of the game. England won 4–2 after extra time, with the scores tied at 2–2 after 90 minutes, and England lifted the World Cup trophy for the first time.

=== Euro 1968 ===
Charlton's next England game was his 75th, as England beat Northern Ireland; after two more appearances he became England's second most-capped player, behind the veteran Billy Wright, who was approaching his 100th match when Charlton was starting out and ended with 105 caps.

Weeks later he scored his 46th England goal in a friendly against Sweden, breaking the record of 44 set the previous year by Jimmy Greaves. He was then in the England team which made it to the semi-finals of the 1968 European Championships, where they were knocked out by Yugoslavia in Florence. During the match Charlton struck a Yugoslav post. England defeated the Soviet Union 2–0 in the third place match.

In 1969, Charlton was appointed an OBE for services to football. More milestones followed as he won his 100th England cap on 21 April 1970 against Northern Ireland, and was made captain by Ramsey for the occasion. Inevitably, he scored; this was his 48th goal for his country – his 49th and final goal followed a month later in a 4–0 win over Colombia during a warm-up tour for the 1970 World Cup, designed to get the players adapted to altitude conditions. Charlton's inevitable selection by Ramsey for the tournament made him the first – and still, to date, only – England player to feature in four World Cup squads.

=== 1970 World Cup ===
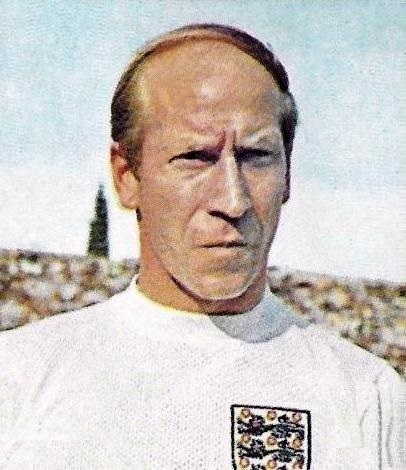
Trading card of Charlton with England. Issued by Panini for the 1970 World Cup

Shortly before the World Cup, Charlton was involved in the Bogotá Bracelet incident in which he and Bobby Moore were accused of stealing a bracelet from a jewellery store. Moore was later arrested and detained for four days before being granted a conditional release, while Charlton was not arrested.

England began the tournament with two victories in the group stages, plus a memorable defeat against Brazil. Charlton played in all three, though was substituted for Alan Ball in the final game of the group against Czechoslovakia. Ramsey, confident of victory and progress to the quarter-final, wanted Charlton to rest.

England reached the last eight where they again faced West Germany. With England leading 2–1, Ramsey replaced Charlton with Colin Bell in the 69th minute: Germany went on to win 3–2 after extra time. England were eliminated and, after a record 106 caps and 49 goals, Charlton decided to end his international career at the age of 32. On the flight home from Mexico, he asked Ramsey not to consider him again. His brother Jack, two years his senior but 71 caps his junior, did likewise.

Charlton's caps record lasted until 1973, when Bobby Moore overtook him; as of November 2026, he lies eighth in the all-time England appearances list behind, in order from highest to lowest, Harry Kane (126 caps), Peter Shilton (125), whose own England career began in the first game after Charlton's had ended, Wayne Rooney (120), David Beckham (115), Steven Gerrard (114), Moore (108), and Ashley Cole (107).

Charlton's goalscoring record was surpassed by Wayne Rooney on 8 September 2015, when Rooney scored a penalty in a 2–0 win over Switzerland in a qualifying match for UEFA Euro 2016.

== Style of play ==
In his early years as a winger who played on the outside left, Charlton possessed great speed and agility. As he matured, Charlton was placed in an offensive midfield role where he flourished as a player. In his prime, Charlton was considered to be one of the greatest players in the world, being able to dictate a game with his accurate passing, and possessing a powerful shot with either foot, often scoring goals from a distance. Charlton also stood out for his stamina, mentality, leadership and modesty, never arguing with referees or opponents.

Longtime Manchester United manager Matt Busby said of Charlton: "There has never been a more popular footballer. He was as near perfection as man and player as it is possible to be." England national team coach Alf Ramsey remarked: "He was one of the greatest players I have ever seen, very much the linchpin of the 1966 team. Early in my management, I knew I had to find a role suitable to Bobby's unique talents. He wasn't just a great goalscorer, with a blistering shot using either foot. Bobby was a player who could also do his share of hard work."

== Management career and directorships ==
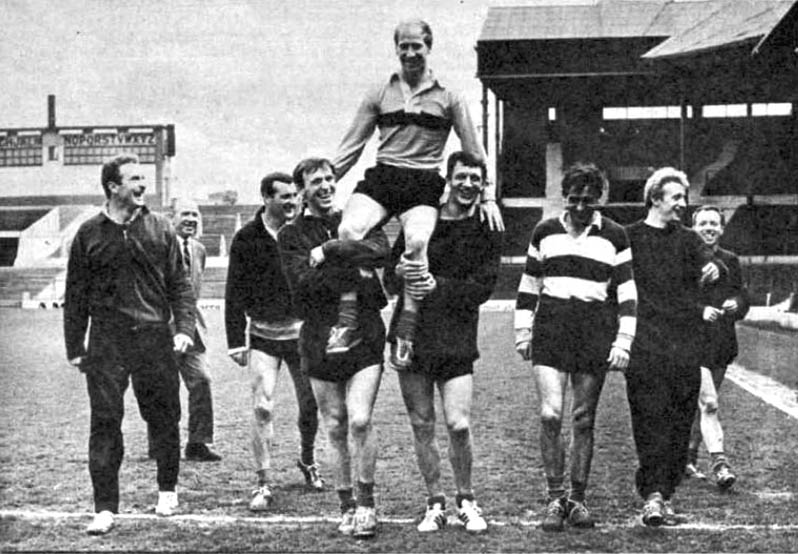
Charlton being raised by teammates Paddy Crerand and David Herd in Old Trafford, 1973

Charlton became the manager of Preston North End in 1973, signing his former United and England teammate Nobby Stiles as player-coach. His first season ended in relegation, and although he began playing again, he left Preston early in the 1975–76 season after a disagreement with the board over the transfer of John Bird to Newcastle United. He was appointed a CBE that year and began a casual association with BBC for punditry on matches, which continued for many years. In early 1976, he scored once in three league appearances for Waterford United. He also made a handful of appearances for Australian clubs Newcastle KB United, Perth Azzurri and Blacktown City.

Charlton joined Wigan Athletic as a director, and was briefly caretaker manager there in 1983. He then spent some time playing in South Africa. He also built up several businesses in areas such as travel, jewellery and hampers, and ran soccer schools in the UK, the US, Canada, Australia and China. In 1984, he was invited to become member of the board of directors at Manchester United, partly because of his football knowledge and partly because it was felt that the club needed a "name" on the board after the resignation of Matt Busby. In June 2005, when the American Glazer family bought Manchester United amidst fan opposition, Charlton apologised to the new owners: "I tried to explain they couldn't ignore the fans, who are so emotionally involved in the club, but who sometimes do go a bit too far."

== Personal life and retirement ==
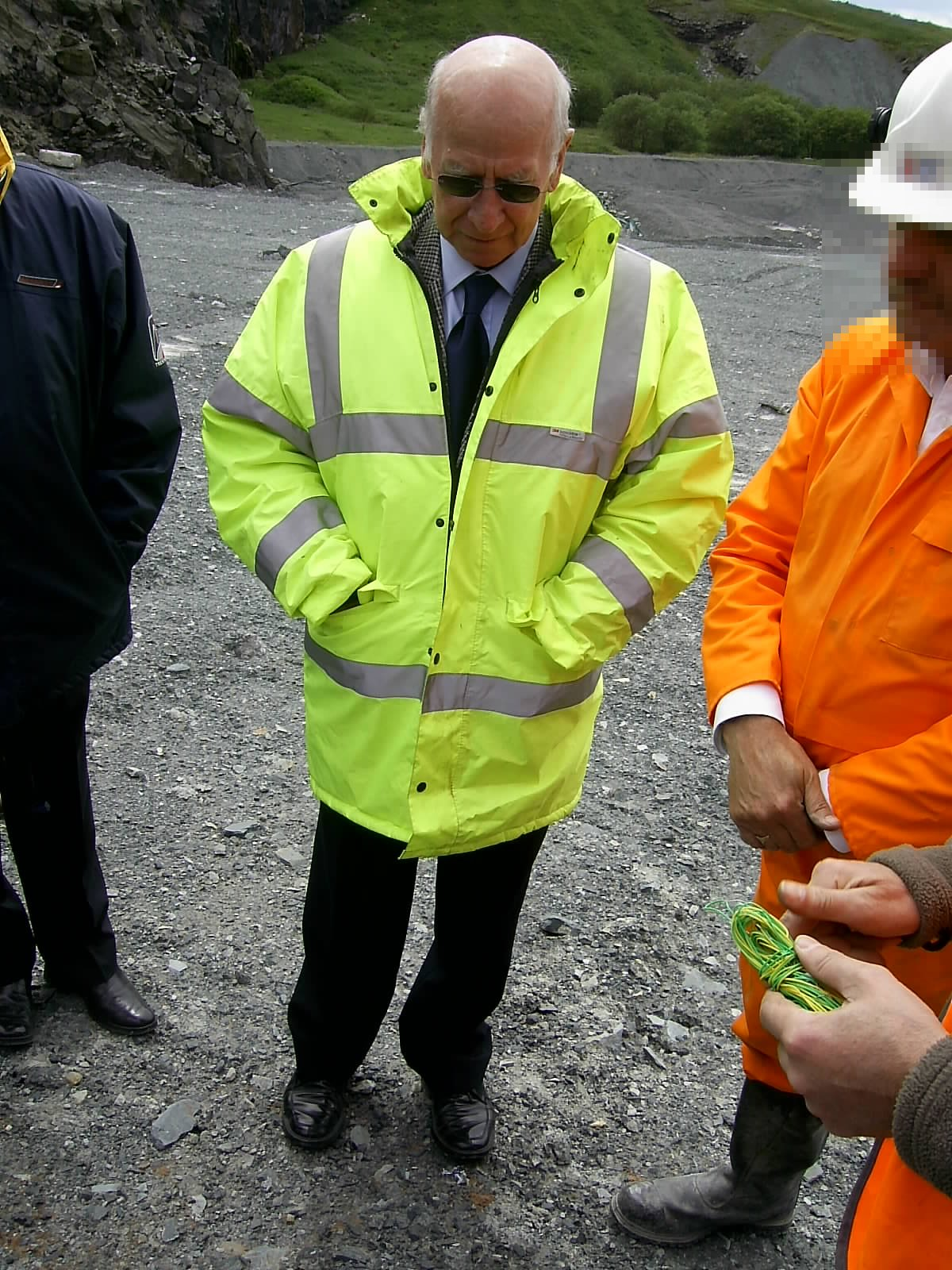
Charlton at an explosives demonstration for the Mines Advisory Group and his own land mine clearance charity, Find a Better Way, in 2008

Charlton met his wife, Norma Ball, at an ice rink in Manchester in 1959 and they married in 1961. They had two daughters, Suzanne and Andrea. Suzanne was a weather forecaster for the BBC during the 1990s. They went on to have grandchildren, including Suzanne's son Robert, who is named in honour of his grandfather.

In 2007, while publicising his forthcoming autobiography, Charlton revealed that he had a long-running feud with his brother Jack. They rarely spoke to each other after a falling-out between his wife Norma and his mother Cissie (who died in 1996 at the age of 83). Bobby Charlton did not see his mother after 1992 as a result of the feud.

Jack presented him with his BBC Sports Personality of the Year Lifetime Achievement Award on 14 December 2008. He said that he was "knocked out" as he was presented the award by his brother. He received a standing ovation as he stood waiting for his prize.

Charlton helped to promote Manchester's bids for the 1996 and 2000 Olympic Games and the 2002 Commonwealth Games, England's bid for the 2006 World Cup and London's successful bid for the 2012 Summer Olympics. He received a knighthood in 1994 and was an Inaugural Inductee to the English Football Hall of Fame in 2002. On accepting his award, he commented: "I'm really proud to be included in the National Football Museum's Hall of Fame. It's a great honour. If you look at the names included I have to say I couldn't argue with them. They are all great players and people I would love to have played with." He was also the (honorary) president of the National Football Museum, an organisation about which he said: "I can't think of a better museum anywhere in the world."

On 2 March 2009, Charlton was given the freedom of the city of Manchester. He stated: "I'm just so proud, it's fantastic. It's a great city. I have always been very proud of it."

Charlton was involved in a number of charitable activities, including fund raising for cancer hospitals. After visits to Bosnia and Cambodia, Charlton became involved in the cause of land mine clearance, and supported the Mines Advisory Group as well as founding his own charity, The Sir Bobby Charlton Foundation (formerly Find a Better Way), which funds research into improved civilian landmine clearance.

In January 2011, Charlton was voted the fourth-greatest Manchester United player of all time by the readers of Inside United and ManUtd.com, behind Ryan Giggs (who topped the poll), Eric Cantona and George Best.

He was a member of the Laureus World Sports Academy. On 6 February 2012, Charlton was taken to hospital after falling ill, and subsequently had a gallstone removed. This prevented him from collecting a Lifetime Achievement Award at the Laureus World Sports Awards.

On 15 February 2016, Manchester United announced the South Stand of Old Trafford would be renamed the Sir Bobby Charlton Stand in honour of Charlton. The unveiling took place at the home game against Everton on 3 April 2016.

In 2015, he received an Honorary Doctorate from the University of Bath.

In October 2017, Charlton had a pitch named after him at St George's Park National Football Centre in Burton-upon-Trent.

In November 2020, it was revealed that Charlton had been diagnosed with dementia and as a result, he withdrew from public life.

== Death ==
Charlton died at Macclesfield District General Hospital in Macclesfield, Cheshire, on 21 October 2023, at the age of 86, from complications of a fall he sustained at the nursing home where he resided; at the subsequent inquest, the coroner recorded his cause of death as "trauma in the lungs, a fall and dementia". His death leaves Geoff Hurst as the last surviving English player of the 1966 World Cup final.

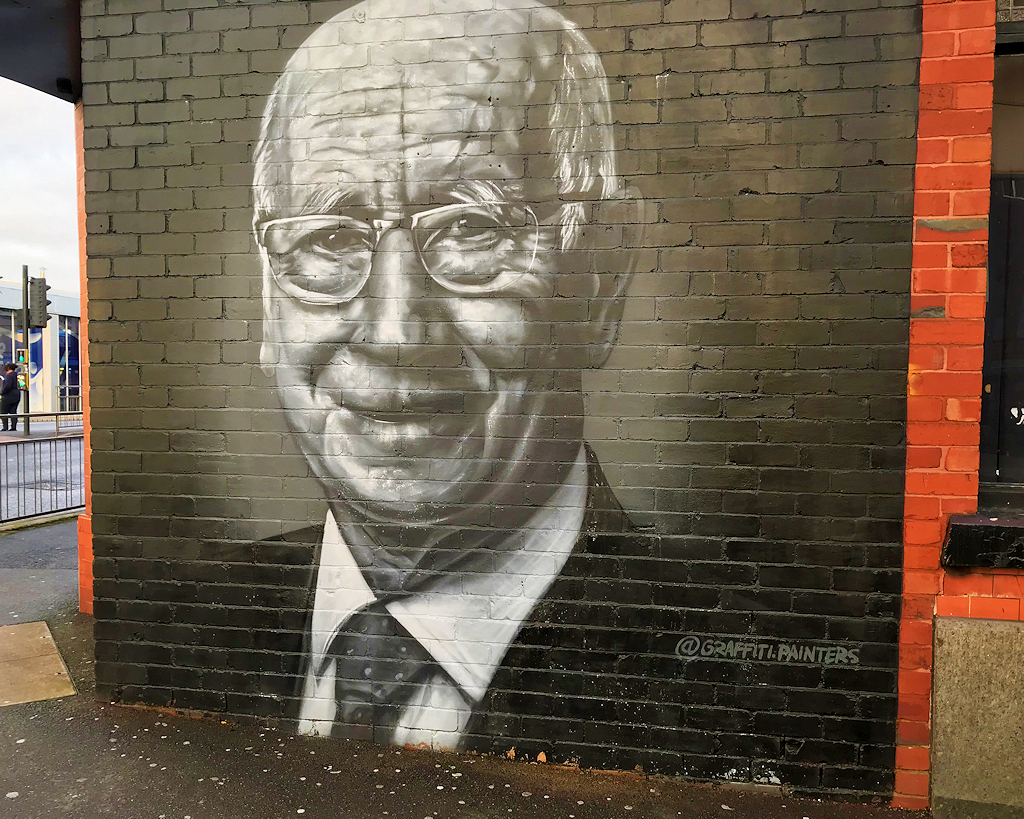
A mural in memory of Charlton near the Old Trafford stadium

Manchester United paid tribute to Charlton at their Champions League match against Copenhagen at Old Trafford three days later in a number of ways. First, United's players wore black armbands, and manager Erik ten Hag was flanked by Alex Stepney and U-21 captain Dan Gore before ten Hag laid a wreath and a minute's silence was observed before the match began. Another wreath was also laid in Charlton's seat in the director's box. In addition, the cover of United's match programme, the United Review, featured Charlton on the front, and supporters laid flowers and scarves at the United Trinity.

The funeral took place on 13 November. The main ceremony was at Manchester Cathedral but the procession called first at the Old Trafford stadium before going to the city centre. Crowds lined the streets and there were about a thousand guests at the service, including Prince William, Alex Ferguson and many others associated with the club. Elegies were read by David Gill and Charlton's grandson William Balderston and there was a musical tribute of "How Great Thou Art" sung by Russell Watson.

== In popular culture ==
- In the episode "Taking Liberties" of the NBC American sitcom Frasier, Daphne Moon (Jane Leeves), who is from Manchester, mentions that one of her uncles tried fanatically to get Charlton's autograph, "until Bobby cracked him over the head with a can of lager. Twelve stitches, and he still has the can!"
- In the 2011 film United, centred on the successes of the Busby Babes and the decimation of the team in the Munich crash, Charlton was portrayed by actor Jack O'Connell.
- In the episode "Munich Air Disaster" of the air crash documentary Mayday, Charlton was interviewed as a survivor in the show, alongside Harry Gregg.

== Career statistics ==
=== Club ===
Appearances and goals by club, season and competition
Club	Season	League			National cup		League cup		Continental		Other		Total	
Club	Season	Division	Apps	Goals	Apps	Goals	Apps	Goals	Apps	Goals	Apps	Goals	Apps	Goals
Manchester United	1956–57	First Division	14	10	2	1	—		1	1	0	0	17	12
Manchester United	1957–58	First Division	21	8	7	5	—		2	3	0	0	30	16
Manchester United	1958–59	First Division	38	29	1	0	—		—		—		39	29
Manchester United	1959–60	First Division	37	18	3	3	—		—		—		40	21
Manchester United	1960–61	First Division	39	21	3	0	0	0	—		—		42	21
Manchester United	1961–62	First Division	37	8	6	2	—		—		—		43	10
Manchester United	1962–63	First Division	28	7	6	2	—		—		—		34	9
Manchester United	1963–64	First Division	40	9	7	2	—		6	4	1	0	54	15
Manchester United	1964–65	First Division	41	10	7	0	—		11	8	—		59	18
Manchester United	1965–66	First Division	38	16	7	0	—		8	2	1	0	54	18
Manchester United	1966–67	First Division	42	12	2	0	0	0	—		—		44	12
Manchester United	1967–68	First Division	41	15	2	1	—		9	2	1	2	53	20
Manchester United	1968–69	First Division	32	5	6	0	—		8	2	2	0	48	7
Manchester United	1969–70	First Division	40	12	9	1	8	1	—		—		57	14
Manchester United	1970–71	First Division	42	5	2	0	6	3	—		—		50	8
Manchester United	1971–72	First Division	40	8	7	2	6	2	—		—		53	12
Manchester United	1972–73	First Division	36	6	1	0	4	1	—		—		41	7
Manchester United	Total		606	199	78	19	24	7	45	22	5	2	758	249
Preston North End	1974–75	Third Division	38	8	4	1	3	1	—		—		45	10
Waterford United	1975–76	League of Ireland	3	1	1	0	0	0	—		—		4	1
Newcastle KB United	1978	National Soccer League	1	0	0	0	0	0	—		—		1	0
Perth Azzurri	1979	National Premier Leagues Western Australia	3	2	0	0	0	0	—		—		3	2
Blacktown City	1980	National Soccer League	1	1	0	0	0	0	—		—		1	1
Career total			652	211	83	20	27	8	45	22	5	2	812	263

=== International ===
Appearances and goals by national team and year
National team	Year	Apps	Goals
England	1958	6	7
England	1959	7	5
England	1960	8	6
England	1961	9	6
England	1962	8	1
England	1963	10	6
England	1964	8	2
England	1965	5	2
England	1966	15	6
England	1967	4	2
England	1968	8	3
England	1969	9	1
England	1970	9	2
Total		106	49

== Honours ==
Manchester United Youth

- FA Youth Cup: 1953–54, 1954–55, 1955–56

Manchester United

- Football League First Division: 1956–57, 1964–65, 1966–67
- FA Cup: 1962–63; runner-up: 1956–57, 1957–58
- FA Charity Shield: 1965, 1967
- European Cup: 1967–68

England

- FIFA World Cup: 1966
- UEFA European Championship third place: 1968
- British Home Championship (outright): 1961, 1965, 1966, 1968, 1969
  - (shared) 1958, 1959, 1960, 1964, 1970

Individual

- FUWO European Team of the Year: 1965, 1966, 1967, 1968
- FWA Footballer of the Year: 1965–66
- FIFA World Cup Golden Ball: 1966
- FIFA World Cup All-Star Team: 1966, 1970
- Ballon d'Or: Winner: 1966; runner-up: 1967, 1968; nominated: 1960, 1961, 1963, 1965, 1969, 1971
- PFA Merit Award: 1974
- FWA Tribute Award: 1989
- FIFA World Cup All-Time Team: 1994
- Football League 100 Legends: 1998
- English Football Hall of Fame: 2002
- FIFA 100: 2004
- UEFA Golden Jubilee Poll: 14th
- BBC Sports Personality of the Year Lifetime Achievement Award: 2008
- UEFA President's Award: 2008
- Laureus Lifetime Achievement Award: 2012
- FIFA Player of the Century:
  - FIFA internet vote: 16th
  - IFFHS vote: 10th
- World Soccer The Greatest Players of the 20th century: 12th
- IFFHS Legends

Orders and special awards

- Officer of the Order of the British Empire (OBE): 1969
- Commander of the Order of the British Empire (CBE): 1974
- Knight Bachelor: 1994
- Order of the Rising Sun, 4th class: 2012

== See also ==
- List of men's footballers with 100 or more international caps

== Bibliography ==
- Charlton, Sir Bobby (2007). The Autobiography: My Manchester United Years. Headline Book Publishing. ISBN 978-0-7553-1619-9.
- Charlton, Jack; Byrne, Peter (1996). The Autobiography. Partridge Press. ISBN 1-85225-256-1.
- Hamilton, Duncan (2023). Answered Prayers: England and the 1966 World Cup. United Kingdom: Quercus Publishing. ISBN 9781529419986.
