= List of international goals scored by Bobby Charlton =

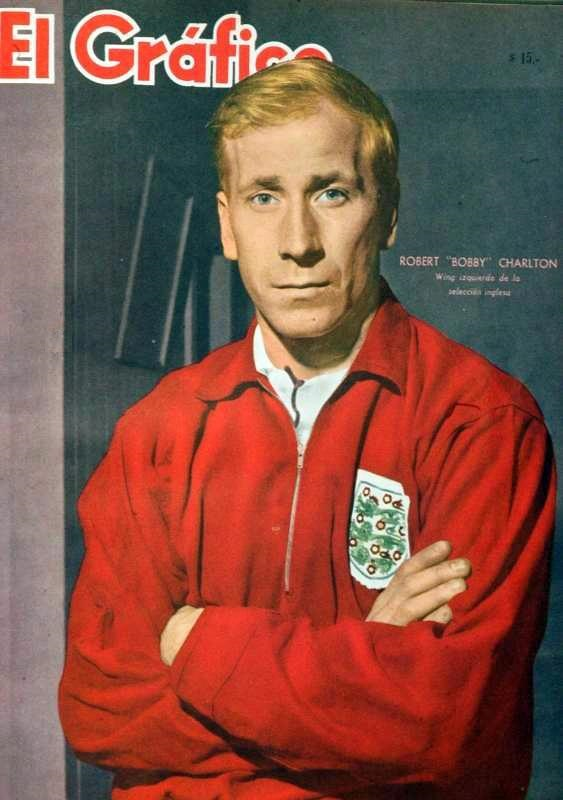
Charlton on the cover of the Argentinian sports magazine El Gráfico, 27 June 1962

Sir Bobby Charlton CBE was a former association footballer who made 106 appearances for England between 1958 and 1970. He is England's third all-time goalscorer, having scored 49 times for his country. He is generally regarded as one of the best midfielders of all time, and was named the Ballon d'Or winner as European football's player of the year in 1966.

Charlton made his international debut for England in April 1958, scoring a goal against Scotland that was described by The Times's football correspondent Geoffrey Green as "surely one of the finest ever seen at Hampden". He was a prolific goalscorer for England in his first thirteen months, scoring at a rate of a-goal-a-game, culminating with his first hat-trick in international football, against the United States in May 1959. He scored his 31st international goal in October 1963 during a 4–0 victory over Wales, and in doing so, became England's top goalscorer, passing the previous record jointly held by Tom Finney and Nat Lofthouse. He subsequently lost the record to his teammate Jimmy Greaves in October 1964, but regained it when he scored his 45th goal in May 1968. He scored his final international goal during a 4–0 win against Colombia in May 1970, and retired from international football after England were knocked out of the 1970 FIFA World Cup. He remained England's leading goalscorer until September 2015, when he was surpassed by Wayne Rooney.

Charlton scored four international hat-tricks; in addition to the one against the United States, he scored three goals in a game against Luxembourg during the 1962 FIFA World Cup qualifiers, and in friendlies against Mexico and Switzerland. He scored more goals against Northern Ireland than any other team, with six goals, while he scored five goals against each of Luxembourg, Portugal, Scotland and Wales. Of Charlton's 49 goals, 22 were scored in friendlies. In competitive matches, the majority of his goals came during British Home Championship matches. Charlton scored 16 times in these matches, including 3 in tournaments which doubled as qualification for UEFA Euro 1968. He scored four goals during FIFA World Cup tournaments, including three goals during the 1966 FIFA World Cup, which England won, collecting one during the group stage and both goals in England's 2–1 victory over Portugal in the semi-final.

== International goals ==
England score listed first, score column indicates score after each Charlton goal.

International goals scored by Bobby Charlton
| No. | Date | Venue | Cap | Opponent | Score | Result | Competition | Ref |
|---|---|---|---|---|---|---|---|---|
| 1 | 19 April 1958 | Hampden Park, Glasgow, Scotland | 1 | Scotland | 3–0 | 4–0 | 1957–58 Home Championship | |
| 2 | 7 May 1958 | Wembley Stadium, London, England | 2 | Portugal | 1–0 | 2–1 | Friendly | |
| 3 | 7 May 1958 | Wembley Stadium, London, England | 2 | Portugal | 2–1 | 2–1 | Friendly | |
| 4 | 4 October 1958 | Windsor Park, Belfast, Northern Ireland | 4 | Northern Ireland | 1–1 | 3–3 | 1958–59 Home Championship | |
| 5 | 4 October 1958 | Windsor Park, Belfast, Northern Ireland | 4 | Northern Ireland | 3–3 | 3–3 | 1958–59 Home Championship | |
| 6 | 22 October 1958 | Wembley Stadium, London, England | 5 | Soviet Union | 4–0 | 5–0 | Friendly | |
| 7 | 11 April 1959 | Wembley Stadium, London, England | 6 | Scotland | 1–0 | 1–0 | 1958–59 Home Championship | |
| 8 | 6 May 1959 | Wembley Stadium, London, England | 7 | Italy | 1–0 | 2–2 | Friendly | |
| 9 | 28 May 1959 | Wrigley Field, Los Angeles, United States | 11 | United States | 3–1 | 8–1 | Friendly | |
| 10 | 28 May 1959 | Wrigley Field, Los Angeles, United States | 11 | United States | 6–1 | 8–1 | Friendly | |
| 11 | 28 May 1959 | Wrigley Field, Los Angeles, United States | 11 | United States | 7–1 | 8–1 | Friendly | |
| 12 | 28 October 1959 | Wembley Stadium, London, England | 13 | Sweden | 2–3 | 2–3 | Friendly | |
| 13 | 9 April 1960 | Hampden Park, Glasgow, Scotland | 14 | Scotland | 1–1 | 1–1 | 1959–60 Home Championship | |
| 14 | 8 October 1960 | Windsor Park, Belfast, Northern Ireland | 18 | Northern Ireland | 3–1 | 5–2 | 1960–61 Home Championship | |
| 15 | 19 October 1960 | Stade Municipal, Luxembourg City, Luxembourg | 19 | Luxembourg | 1–0 | 9–0 | 1962 FIFA World Cup qualification | |
| 16 | 19 October 1960 | Stade Municipal, Luxembourg City, Luxembourg | 19 | Luxembourg | 2–0 | 9–0 | 1962 FIFA World Cup qualification | |
| 17 | 19 October 1960 | Stade Municipal, Luxembourg City, Luxembourg | 19 | Luxembourg | 7–0 | 9–0 | 1962 FIFA World Cup qualification | |
| 18 | 23 November 1960 | Wembley Stadium, London, England | 21 | Wales | 2–0 | 5–1 | 1960–61 Home Championship | |
| 19 | 10 May 1961 | Wembley Stadium, London, England | 23 | Mexico | 2–0 | 8–0 | Friendly | |
| 20 | 10 May 1961 | Wembley Stadium, London, England | 23 | Mexico | 6–0 | 8–0 | Friendly | |
| 21 | 10 May 1961 | Wembley Stadium, London, England | 23 | Mexico | 7–0 | 8–0 | Friendly | |
| 22 | 28 September 1961 | Highbury, London, England | 27 | Luxembourg | 3–0 | 4–1 | 1962 FIFA World Cup qualification | |
| 23 | 28 September 1961 | Highbury, London, England | 27 | Luxembourg | 4–1 | 4–1 | 1962 FIFA World Cup qualification | |
| 24 | 22 November 1961 | Wembley Stadium, London, England | 30 | Northern Ireland | 1–0 | 1–1 | 1961–62 Home Championship | |
| 25 | 2 June 1962 | Estadio Braden Copper, Rancagua, Chile | 36 | Argentina | 2–1 | 3–1 | 1962 FIFA World Cup | |
| 26 | 29 May 1963 | Tehelné pole, Bratislava, Czechoslovakia | 42 | Czechoslovakia | 3–1 | 4–2 | Friendly | |
| 27 | 2 June 1963 | Zentralstadion, Leipzig, East Germany | 43 | East Germany | 2–1 | 2–1 | Friendly | |
| 28 | 5 June 1963 | St. Jakob Park, Basel, Switzerland | 44 | Switzerland | 1–0 | 8–1 | Friendly | |
| 29 | 5 June 1963 | St. Jakob Park, Basel, Switzerland | 44 | Switzerland | 5–1 | 8–1 | Friendly | |
| 30 | 5 June 1963 | St. Jakob Park, Basel, Switzerland | 44 | Switzerland | 8–1 | 8–1 | Friendly | |
| 31 | 12 October 1963 | Ninian Park, Cardiff, Wales | 45 | Wales | 4–0 | 4–0 | 1963–64 Home Championship | |
| 32 | 17 May 1964 | Estádio Nacional, Lisbon, Portugal | 50 | Portugal | 2–1 | 4–3 | Friendly | |
| 33 | 27 May 1964 | Downing Stadium, New York City, United States | 52 | United States | 8–0 | 10–0 | Friendly | |
| 34 | 10 April 1965 | Wembley Stadium, London, England | 57 | Scotland | 1–0 | 2–2 | 1964–65 Home Championship | |
| 35 | 20 October 1965 | Wembley Stadium, London, England | 59 | Austria | 1–0 | 2–3 | Friendly | |
| 36 | 2 April 1966 | Hampden Park, Glasgow, Scotland | 63 | Scotland | 4–2 | 4–3 | 1965–66 Home Championship | |
| 37 | 4 May 1966 | Wembley Stadium, London, England | 64 | Yugoslavia | 2–0 | 2–0 | Friendly | |
| 38 | 16 July 1966 | Wembley Stadium, London, England | 69 | Mexico | 1–0 | 2–0 | 1966 FIFA World Cup | |
| 39 | 26 July 1966 | Wembley Stadium, London, England | 72 | Portugal | 1–0 | 2–1 | 1966 FIFA World Cup | |
| 40 | 26 July 1966 | Wembley Stadium, London, England | 72 | Portugal | 2–0 | 2–1 | 1966 FIFA World Cup | |
| 41 | 16 November 1966 | Wembley Stadium, London, England | 76 | Wales | 3–1 | 5–1 | 1966–67 Home Championship, UEFA Euro 1968 qualification | |
| 42 | 21 October 1967 | Ninian Park, Cardiff, Wales | 78 | Wales | 2–0 | 3–0 | 1967–68 Home Championship, UEFA Euro 1968 qualification | |
| 43 | 22 November 1967 | Wembley Stadium, London, England | 79 | Northern Ireland | 2–0 | 2–0 | 1967–68 Home Championship, UEFA Euro 1968 qualification | |
| 44 | 3 April 1968 | Wembley Stadium, London, England | 82 | Spain | 1–0 | 1–0 | UEFA Euro 1968 qualification | |
| 45 | 22 May 1968 | Wembley Stadium, London, England | 84 | Sweden | 2–0 | 3–1 | Friendly | |
| 46 | 8 June 1968 | Stadio Olimpico, Rome, Italy | 86 | Soviet Union | 1–0 | 2–0 | UEFA Euro 1968 | |
| 47 | 7 May 1969 | Wembley Stadium, London, England | 91 | Wales | 1–1 | 2–1 | 1968–69 Home Championship | |
| 48 | 21 April 1970 | Wembley Stadium, London, England | 100 | Northern Ireland | 3–1 | 3–1 | 1969–70 Home Championship | |
| 49 | 20 May 1970 | Estadio El Campín, Bogotá, Colombia | 101 | Colombia | 3–0 | 4–0 | Friendly | |

== Statistics ==
Goals by year
| Year | Apps | Goals |
|---|---|---|
| 1958 | 6 | 7 |
| 1959 | 7 | 5 |
| 1960 | 8 | 6 |
| 1961 | 9 | 6 |
| 1962 | 8 | 1 |
| 1963 | 10 | 6 |
| 1964 | 8 | 2 |
| 1965 | 5 | 2 |
| 1966 | 15 | 6 |
| 1967 | 4 | 2 |
| 1968 | 8 | 3 |
| 1969 | 9 | 1 |
| 1970 | 9 | 2 |
| Total | 106 | 49 |

Goals by competition
| Competition | Goals |
|---|---|
| Friendlies | 22 |
| British Home Championship | 16 (Note: Three of Charlton's goals came in matches which were part of both the British Home Championship and the UEFA Euro 1968 qualifying campaign.) |
| FIFA World Cup qualification | 5 |
| UEFA European Championship qualification | 4 |
| FIFA World Cup tournaments | 4 |
| UEFA European Championship tournaments | 1 |
| Total | 49 |

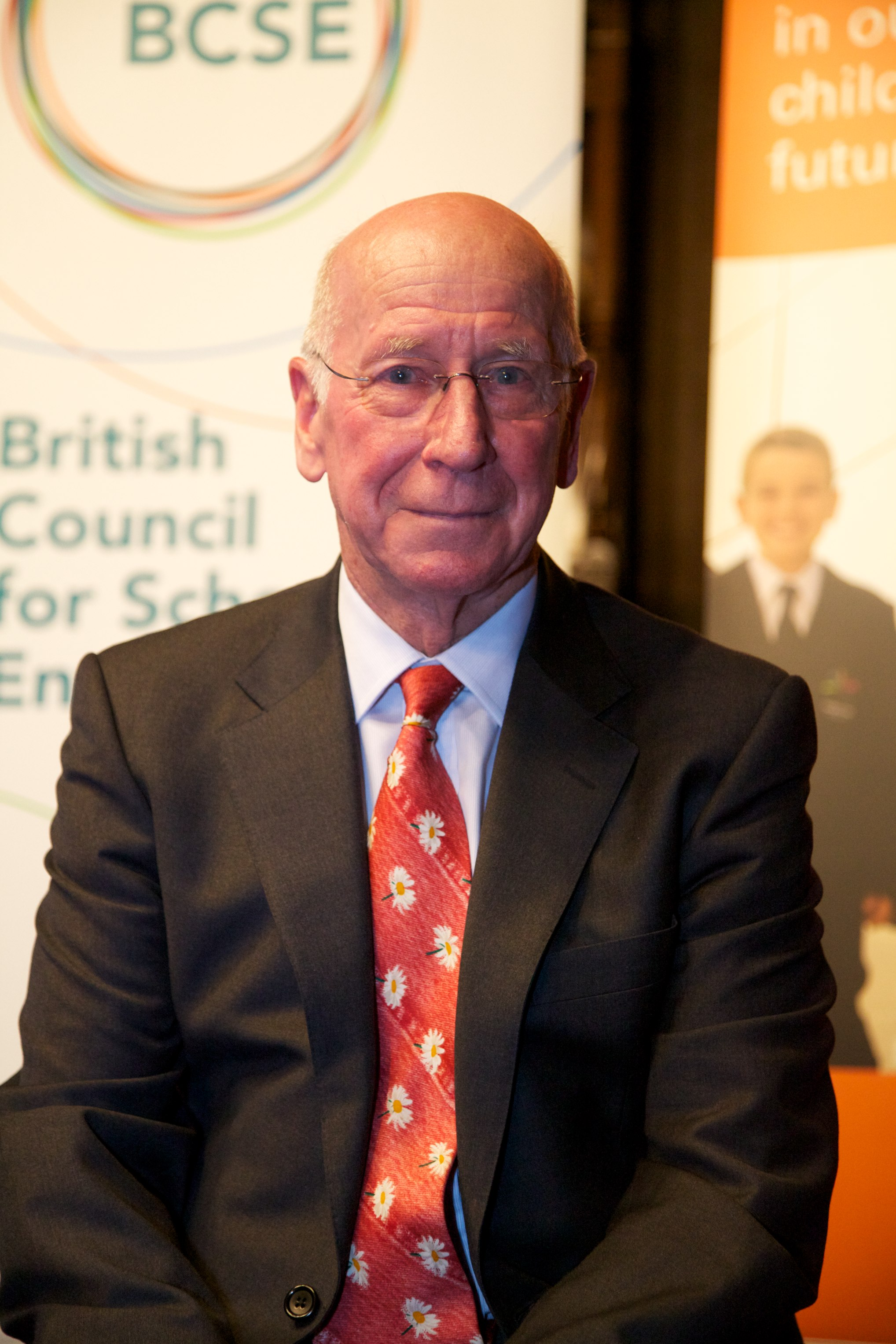
Charlton in 2010
