= 1965–66 in Scottish football =

Division One champions
- Celtic

Division Two champions
- Ayr United

Scottish Cup winners
- Rangers

League Cup winners
- Celtic

Junior Cup winners
- Bonnyrigg Rose Athletic

Teams in Europe
- Celtic, Dunfermline Athletic, Heart of Midlothian, Hibernian, Kilmarnock

Scotland national team
- 1966 BHC, 1966 World Cup qualification

The 1965–66 season was the 93rd season of competitive football in Scotland and the 69th season of Scottish league football.

== Overview ==
After the openness of recent years, the Old Firm came back strongly this season. Celtic won their first title under the management of Jock Stein, their first since 1954 and rivals Rangers finished as runners-up. For the only time in Scottish football, the Old Firm teams finished first and second in all three domestic competitions.

== Scottish League Division One ==
Pos	Team	Pld	W	D	L	GF	GA	GD	Pts	Qualification
1	Celtic	34	27	3	4	106	30	+76	57	
2	Rangers	34	25	5	4	91	29	+62	55	
3	Kilmarnock	34	20	5	9	73	46	+27	45	
4	Dunfermline	34	19	6	9	94	55	+39	44	
5	Dundee United	34	19	5	10	79	51	+28	43	
6	Hibernian	34	16	6	12	81	55	+26	38	
7	Hearts	34	13	12	9	56	48	+8	38	
8	Aberdeen	34	15	6	13	61	54	+7	36	
9	Dundee	34	14	6	14	61	61	0	34	
10	Falkirk	34	15	1	18	48	72	−24	31	
11	Clyde	34	13	4	17	62	64	−2	30	
12	Partick Thistle	34	10	10	14	55	64	−9	30	
13	Motherwell	34	12	4	18	52	69	−17	28	
14	St Johnstone	34	9	8	17	58	81	−23	26	
15	Stirling Albion	34	9	8	17	40	68	−28	26	
16	St Mirren	34	9	4	21	44	82	−38	22	
17	Morton (R)	34	8	5	21	42	84	−42	21	Relegated to the Second Division
18	Hamilton Academical (R)	34	3	2	29	27	117	−90	8	Relegated to the Second Division

Source: RSSSF
(R) Relegated

Champions: Celtic
Relegated: Greenock Morton, Hamilton Academical

== Scottish League Division Two ==
Pos	Team	Pld	W	D	L	GF	GA	GD	Pts	Promotion or relegation
1	Ayr United	36	22	9	5	78	37	+41	53	Promotion to the 1966–67 First Division
2	Airdrieonians	36	22	6	8	107	56	+51	50	Promotion to the 1966–67 First Division
3	Queen of the South	36	18	11	7	73	46	+27	47	
4	East Fife	36	20	4	12	72	55	+17	44	
5	Raith Rovers	36	16	11	9	71	43	+28	43	
6	Arbroath	36	15	13	8	72	52	+20	43	
7	Albion Rovers	36	18	7	11	58	54	+4	43	
8	Alloa Athletic	36	14	10	12	65	65	0	38	
9	Montrose	36	15	7	14	67	63	+4	37	
10	Cowdenbeath	36	15	7	14	69	68	+1	37	
11	Berwick Rangers	36	12	11	13	69	58	+11	35	
12	Dumbarton	36	14	7	15	63	61	+2	35	
13	Queen's Park	36	13	7	16	62	65	−3	33	
14	Third Lanark	36	12	8	16	55	65	−10	32	
15	Stranraer	36	9	10	17	64	83	−19	28	
16	Brechin City	36	10	7	19	52	92	−40	27	
17	East Stirlingshire	36	9	5	22	59	91	−32	23	
18	Stenhousemuir	36	6	7	23	47	93	−46	19	
19	Forfar Athletic	36	7	3	26	61	120	−59	17	

Promoted: Ayr United, Airdrieonians

== Cup honours ==
Competition	Winner	Score	Runner-up
Scottish Cup 1965–66	Rangers	1 – 0 (rep.)	Celtic
League Cup 1965–66	Celtic	2 – 1	Rangers
Junior Cup	Bonnyrigg Rose Athletic	6 – 1 (rep.)	Whitburn

== Individual honours ==
Award	Winner	Club
Footballer of the Year	(Scotland) John Greig	Rangers

== Scottish clubs in Europe ==
=== Celtic ===
Date	Venue	Opponents	Score	Competition	Celtic scorer(s)
28 September 1965	De Adelaarshorst, Deventer (A)	(Netherlands) Go Ahead Eagles	6–0	CWC1	
7 October 1965	Celtic Park, Glasgow (H)	(Netherlands) Go Ahead Eagles	1–0	CWC1	
3 November 1965	Atletion, Aarhus (A)	(Denmark) AGF Aarhus	1–0	CWC2	
17 November 1965	Celtic Park, Glasgow (H)	(Denmark) AGF Aarhus	2–0	CWC2	
12 January 1966	Celtic Park, Glasgow (H)	(Ukraine) Dinamo Kiev	3–0	CWC3	
26 January 1966	Lobanovsky Dynamo Stadium, Kiev (A)	(Ukraine) Dinamo Kiev	1–1	CWC3	
14 April 1966	Celtic Park, Glasgow (H)	(England) Liverpool	1–0	CWCSF	
19 April 1966	Anfield, Liverpool (A)	(England) Liverpool	0–2	CWCSF	

=== Dunfermline Athletic ===
Date	Venue	Opponents	Score	Competition	Dufernline scorer(s)
3 November 1965	East End Park, Dunfermline (H)	(Denmark) KB Copenhagen	5–0	FC2	
17 November 1965	Frederiksberg, Copenhagen (A)	(Denmark) KB Copenhagen	2–4	FC2	
26 January 1966	East End Park, Dunfermline (H)	(Czechoslovakia) FC Zbrojovka Brno	2–0	FC3	
16 February 1966	Městský fotbalový stadion Srbská, Brno (A)	(Czechoslovakia) FC Zbrojovka Brno	0–0	FC3	
8 March 1966	East End Park, Dunfermline (H)	(Spain) Real Zaragoza	1–0	FCQF	
20 March 1966	La Romareda, Zaragoza (H)	(Spain) Real Zaragoza	2–4	FCQF	

=== Heart of Midlothian ===
Date	Venue	Opponents	Score	Competition	Hearts scorer(s)
18 October 1965	Tynecastle Park, Edinburgh (H)	(Norway) Valerengen	1–0	FC1	
27 October 1965	Ullevaal Stadion, Oslo (A)	(Norway) Valerengen	3–1	FC1	
12 January 1966	Tynecastle Park, Edinburgh (H)	(Spain) Real Zaragoza	3–3	FC2	
26 January 1966	Estadio Mestalla, Valencia (A)	(Spain) Real Zaragoza	2–2	FC2	
2 March 1966	Estadio Mestalla, Valencia (A)	(Spain) Real Zaragoza	0–1	FC2	

=== Hibernian ===
Date	Venue	Opponents	Score	Competition	Hibs scorer(s)
8 September 1965	Easter Road, Edinburgh (H)	(Spain) Valencia CF	2–0	FC1	
12 October 1965	Estadio Mestalla, Valencia (A)	(Spain) Valencia CF	0–2	FC1	
3 November 1965	Estadio Mestalla, Valencia (A)	(Spain) Valencia CF	0–3	FC1	

=== Kilmarnock ===
Date	Venue	Opponents	Score	Competition	Kilmarnock scorer(s)
8 September 1965	Selman Stërmasi Stadium, Tirana (A)	(Albania) KF Tirana	0–0	ECPR	
29 September 1965	Rugby Park, Kilmarnock (H)	(Albania) KF Tirana	1–0	ECPR	
17 November 1965	Rugby Park, Kilmarnock (H)	(Spain) Real Madrid	2–2	EC1	
1 December 1965	Santiago Bernabéu Stadium, Madrid (A)	(Spain) Real Madrid	1–5	EC1	

== Other honours ==
=== National ===
Competition	Winner	Score	Runner-up
Scottish Qualifying Cup – North	Inverness Caledonian	5 – 1 *	Elgin City
Scottish Qualifying Cup – South	Gala Fairydean	8 – 5 *	Vale of Leithen

=== County ===
Competition	Winner	Score	Runner-up
Aberdeenshire Cup	Deveronvale		
Ayrshire Cup	Kilmarnock	3 – 1 *	Ayr United
East of Scotland Shield	Hearts	4 – 2	Hibernian
Fife Cup	Dunfermline Athletic	6 – 6 * ‡	Raith Rovers
Forfarshire Cup	Dundee	2 – 1	Brechin City
Lanarkshire Cup	Airdrie		
Renfrewshire Cup	Morton	3 – 1 * †	St Mirren
Stirlingshire Cup	Alloa Athletic	wo	Stirling Albion

^{*} – aggregate over two legs
† – play off
‡ – trophy shared

=== Highland League ===
Top Three
Pos	Team	Pld	W	D	L	GF	GA	GD	Pts
1	Elgin City	30	24	5	1	96	35	+61	53
2	Inverness Caledonian	30	21	5	4	111	46	+65	47
3	Ross County	29	19	2	8	92	50	+42	40

== Scotland national team ==
The Scottish national football side failed to qualify for the 1966 FIFA World Cup, which was ultimately won by the host nation England.

Date	Venue	Opponents	Score	Competition	Scotland scorer(s)
2 October 1965	Windsor Park, Belfast (A)	Northern Ireland	2–3	BHC	Alan Gilzean (2)
13 October 1965	Hampden Park, Glasgow (H)	Poland	1–2	WCQG8	Billy McNeill
9 November 1965	Hampden Park, Glasgow (H)	Italy	1–0	WCQG8	John Greig
2 October 1965	Hampden Park, Glasgow (H)	Wales	4–1	BHC	Bobby Murdoch (2), Willie Henderson, John Greig
7 December 1965	Stadio San Paolo, Naples (A)	Italy	0–3	WCQG8	
2 April 1966	Hampden Park, Glasgow (H)	England	3–4	BHC	Jimmy Johnstone (2), Denis Law
11 May 1966	Hampden Park, Glasgow (H)	Netherlands	0–3	Friendly	
18 June 1966	Hampden Park, Glasgow (H)	Portugal	0–1	Friendly	
25 June 1966	Hampden Park, Glasgow (H)	Brazil	1–1	Friendly	Stevie Chalmers

1966 British Home Championship – Third Place

Key:

- (H) = Home match
- (A) = Away match
- WCQG8 = World Cup qualifying – Group 8
- BHC = British Home Championship
