= Jack Milburn (footballer) =

English footballer and manager

Personal information
- Full name: John Milburn
- Date of birth: 18 March 1908
- Place of birth: Ashington, Northumberland, England
- Date of death: 21 August 1979 (aged 71)
- Position: Left back

Youth career
- Seaton Hirst Corinthians
- Spen Black & White

Senior career*
Years	Team	Apps	(Gls)
1928–1939	Leeds United	386	(28)
1939–1946	→ Norwich City (wartime)	15	(0)
1946–1947	Bradford City	14	(3)
Total		415	(31)

Managerial career
- 1947–1948: Bradford City
- * Club domestic league appearances and goals

John Milburn (18 March 1908 – 21 August 1979) was an English footballer who played 408 games for Leeds United. He was also a football manager.

== Biography ==
Born in Ashington, Northumberland, England, Milburn was a member of the famous Milburn footballing family. His cousin Jackie, known as Wor Jackie, played for Newcastle United. Other members of the Milburn family included brothers George (Leeds United and Chesterfield), Jimmy (Leeds United and Bradford) and Stan (Chesterfield, Leicester City and Rochdale), as well as his nephews Bobby and Jack Charlton.

== Playing career ==
Jack Milburn was a left back who played a total of 423 league and cup games in a career that was interrupted for seven years by World War II. All but 15 of those were for Leeds United. In 2000, he was voted the 83rd greatest Leeds player by the club.

He finished his career at Bradford City where he played 14 league games.

== Managerial career ==
Milburn had moved to Bradford City in October 1946, in the twilight of his playing career as player-coach to Jack Barker. Barker resigned in January 1947 after just eight months in charge leaving Milburn as the natural replacement becoming the club's first ever player-manager.

Milburn led the club to fifth in Division Three (North) in his first six months in charge. The following season the club came just 14th and during the summer Milburn handed over to David Steele although he remained at the club as Steele's assistant.
