= Stanley Milburn =

English footballer

Stan Milburn
Personal information
- Full name: Stanley Milburn
- Date of birth: 27 October 1926
- Place of birth: Ashington, England
- Date of death: 30 July 2010 (aged 83)
- Place of death: Rochdale, England
- Position: Full-back

Senior career*
Years	Team	Apps	(Gls)
19??–1947	Ashington	?	(?)
1947–1952	Chesterfield	179	(0)
1952–1959	Leicester City	171	(1)
1959–1965	Rochdale	237	(26)
Total		587	(27)

International career
1950	England B	1	(0)
- * Club domestic league appearances and goals

Stanley Milburn (27 October 1926 – 30 July 2010) was an English football full back. Part of a famous footballing dynasty, he was brother of John ('Jack') Milburn b 1908 (Leeds United and Bradford City), George Milburn b 1910 (Leeds United and Chesterfield), James ('Jimmy') Milburn b 1919 (Leeds United and Bradford City), cousin of Jackie Milburn and uncle of Jack and Bobby Charlton.

Milburn began his career at local non-league club Ashington where he attracted the attentions of Chesterfield for whom he signed in January 1947. In March 1952 he moved to Leicester City where he won a second division medal in 1953-54. Despite being a good club servant Milburn's time at Filbert Street is remembered as much for a unique occurrence when he and defensive partner Jack Froggatt both mishit a clearance simultaneously, thus registering the Football League's only occurrence of an own goal credited to two different players. He moved to Rochdale in January 1959 and earned a testimonial at the club, creating another unique achievement by being awarded this honour at all three of his league clubs. Milburn also guested for Gloucester City in 1955.

Following his retirement he settled in Rochdale where he worked as a warehouseman.

He died on 30 July 2010 at the age of 83. His funeral took place at Rochdale Crematorium three weeks later, with his one England B cap placed on his coffin.

== Honours ==
Rochdale

- Football League Cup runner-up: 1961–62
