= 1964–65 British Home Championship =

Tournament details
- Host country: England, Ireland, Scotland and Wales
- Dates: 3 October 1964 – 10 April 1965
- Teams: 4

Final positions
- Champions: England
- Runners-up: Wales

Tournament statistics
- Matches played: 6
- Goals scored: 29 (4.83 per match)
- Top scorer(s): (England) Jimmy Greaves (4)

The 1964–65 British Home Championship was an outright victory for the English football team in the run up to the 1966 FIFA World Cup which was held in the country. England's preparation for the tournament had included a rare pre-season tour of the Americas, in which they had beaten the USA 10–0 in New York, but crashed to a 1–5 defeat by Brazil in Rio de Janeiro and also lost to Argentina. The Home Championship was a close contest however and an unexpected Welsh defeat of Scotland as well as a drubbing of Ireland in their final game helped them to an impressive second. In the end however, none of the other home nations would qualify for the world cup finals, which England would go on to win.

The tournament opened with a dramatic match between England and Ireland, in which England went 4–0 up in the first half-hour, but eventually were forced to hold on in the face of an Irish counter-attack which reduced the deficit to 4–3. Fancied Scotland meanwhile began badly with a loss to Wales in Cardiff. In the second games, Ireland again ran a favorite close, eventually succumbing 3–2 to the Scots in a close game in which the lead changed several times. The Welsh too played well, only narrowly losing to eventual champions England. In the final match, the already last-placed Irish were demolished by a more driven Welsh team seeking a rare title, going down 5–0. In London, the Scots and the English fought out a 2–2 draw which put the championship out of Wales' reach by giving England five points.

== Table ==
Team	Pld	W	D	L	GF	GA	GD	Pts
England (C)	3	2	1	0	8	6	+2	5
Wales	3	2	0	1	9	4	+5	4
Scotland	3	1	1	1	7	7	0	3
Ireland	3	0	0	3	5	12	−7	0

Rules for classification: 1) points. The points system worked as follows: 2 points for a win and 1 point for a draw.
(C) Champions

== Results ==
3 October 1964

Ireland	3–4	England
Wilson 52'; McLaughlin 55', 67'		Pickering 7'; Greaves 12', 16', 24'

Windsor Park, Belfast
Attendance: 58,000
Referee: William Brittle (Scotland)

3 October 1964

Wales	3–2	Scotland
Davies 6'; Leek 87', 89'		Chalmers 28'; Gibson 29'

Ninian Park, Cardiff
Attendance: 37,093
Referee: Kevin Howley (England)

18 November 1964

England	2–1	Wales
Wignall 17', 60'		Jones 75'

Wembley Stadium, London
Attendance: 40,000
Referee: Thomas Mitchell (Northern Ireland)

25 November 1964

Scotland	3–2	Ireland
Wilson 10', 30'; Gilzean 16'		Best 9'; Irvine 18'

Hampden Park, Glasgow
Attendance: 48,752
Referee: George Powell (Wales)

31 March 1965

Ireland	0–5	Wales
	Report	Jones 20'; Vernon 33', 48'; Williams; Allchurch

Windsor Park, Belfast
Attendance: 15,000
Referee: Ken Dagnall (England)

10 April 1965

England	2–2	Scotland
Charlton 24'; Greaves 34'	Report (page 4)	Law 40'; St John 59'

Wembley Stadium, London
Attendance: 98,199
Referee: István Zsolt (Hungary
