= Jim Milburn =

English footballer (1919–1985)

James Milburn (21 September 1919 – 1 January 1985) was an English professional footballer who played as a left-back for Leeds United (220 appearances, 17 goals) and Bradford Park Avenue (90 appearances, 10 goals).

He was a member of the famous Milburn footballing clan. His cousin Jackie, known as Wor Jackie, played for Newcastle United. Other members of the Milburn family included brothers Jack (Leeds United and Bradford City), George (Leeds United and Chesterfield) and Stan (Chesterfield, Leicester City and Rochdale).
