= George Milburn =

English footballer

George William Milburn (24 June 1910 – 24 June 1980) was an English footballer who played for Leeds United and Chesterfield.

== Biography ==
Milburn was a member of the famous Milburn footballing family. His cousin Jackie, known as Wor Jackie, played for Newcastle United. Other members of the Milburn family included brothers Jack (Leeds United and Bradford City), Jim (Leeds United and Bradford Park Avenue) and Stan (Chesterfield, Leicester City and Rochdale).
