= 1965–66 British Home Championship =

Tournament details
- Host country: England, Ireland, Scotland and Wales
- Dates: 2 October 1965 – 2 April 1966
- Teams: 4

Final positions
- Champions: England
- Runners-up: Ireland

Tournament statistics
- Matches played: 6
- Goals scored: 25 (4.17 per match)
- Top scorer: (Northern Ireland) Willie Irvine (3)

The 1965–66 British Home Championship was a cause of great excitement as it supplied spectators and commentators a view of England prior to their contesting the 1966 FIFA World Cup on home soil at which they were one of the favourites. None of the other Home Nations had qualified for the World Cup and so were determined to spoil England's preparation, leading to some very dramatic and heavily contested matches, particularly England's final game in Glasgow.

The England team began with a subdued goalless draw with the Welsh side whilst Ireland beat Scotland 3–2 in a close fought game at home. Both England and Scotland improved in their second games, England beating a tough Irish side at home 2–1, whilst the Scots put four goals past the struggling Welsh. Wales suffered further in their final match of the series, losing 1–4 at home to the Irish, who claimed a surprise second place in the tournament. England and Scotland then played a thrilling game in Glasgow, which England finally won 4–3 to take the title of British Champions, a title they would add to at the World Cup three months later.

== Table ==
Team	Pld	W	D	L	GF	GA	GD	Pts
England (C)	3	2	1	0	6	4	+2	5
Ireland	3	2	0	1	8	5	+3	4
Scotland	3	1	0	2	9	8	+1	2
Wales	3	0	1	2	2	8	−6	1

Rules for classification: 1) points. The points system worked as follows: 2 points for a win and 1 point for a draw.
(C) Champions

== Results ==
2 October 1965

Ireland	3–2	Scotland
Dougan 42'; Crossan 60'; Irvine 89'		Gilzean 17', 81'

Windsor Park, Belfast
Attendance: 50,000
Referee: Jack Taylor (England)

2 October 1965

Wales	0–0	England

Ninian Park, Cardiff
Attendance: 30,000
Referee: Archibald Webster (Scotland)

24 November 1965

Scotland	4–1	Wales
Murdoch 1', 22'; Henderson 15'; Greig 86'		Allchurch 14'

Hampden Park, Glasgow
Attendance: 49,888
Referee: Jim Finney (England)

10 November 1965

England	2–1	Ireland
Baker 19'; Peacock 73'		Irvine 21'

Wembley Stadium, London
Attendance: 70,000
Referee: Leo Callaghan (Wales)

30 March 1966

Wales	1–4	Ireland
Davies 74'		Irvine 2'; Wilson 42'; Welsh 53'; Harvey 55'

Ninian Park, Cardiff
Attendance: 12,860
Referee: Jim Finney (England)

2 April 1966

Scotland	3–4	England
Law 41'; Johnstone 62', 81'		Hurst 18'; Hunt 34', 47'; Charlton 73'

Hampden Park, Glasgow
Attendance: 123,052
Referee: Henri Faucheux (France)
