= Tyne Yard =

Railway freight yard in Tyne and Wear, England

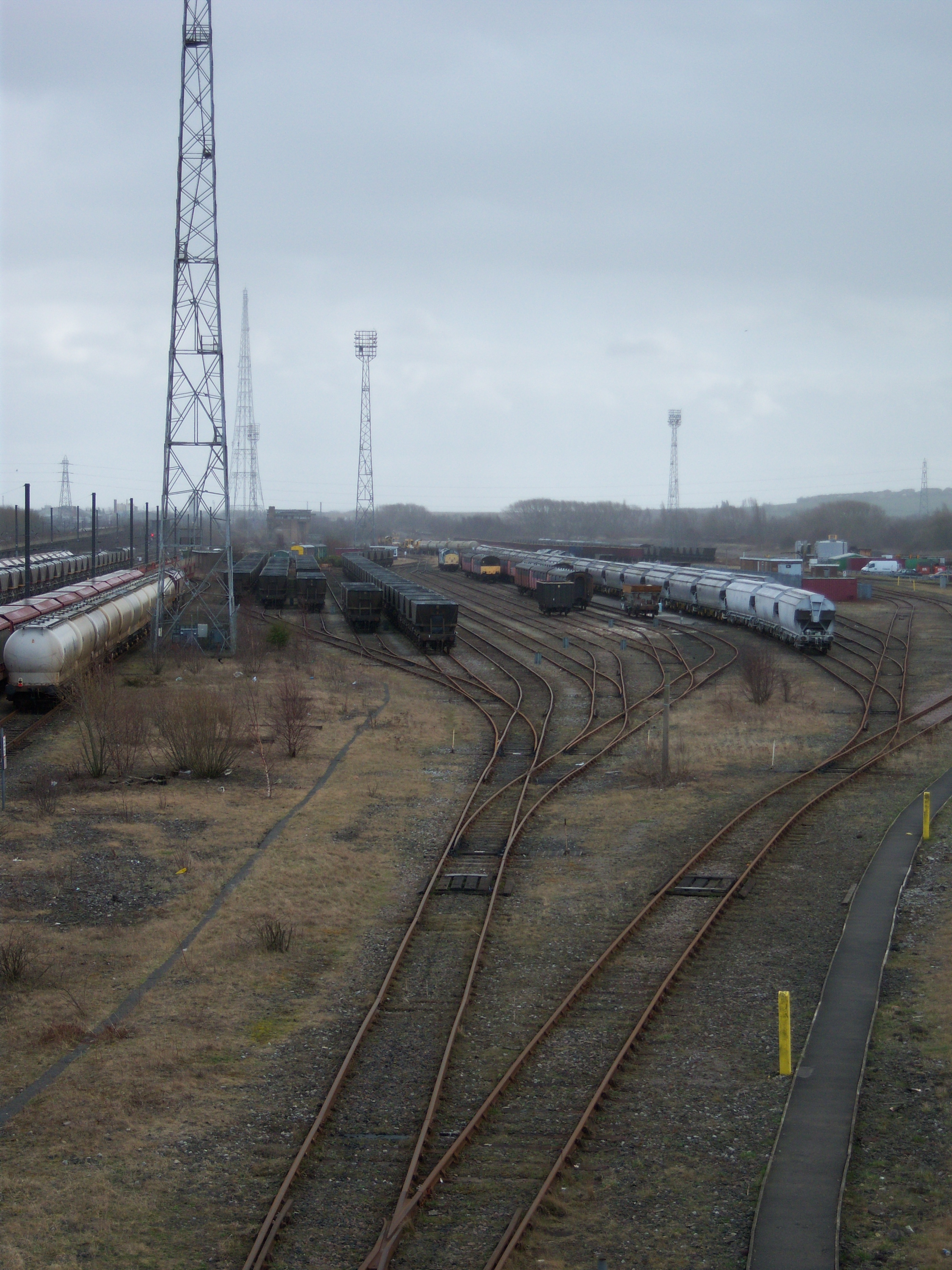
- Some of the sidings viewed from Smithy Lane road bridge
- Interactive map of Tyne Yard

Location
- Location: Gateshead, Tyne and Wear, England
- Coordinates: 54.913°N 1.600°W
- OS grid: NZ2562057641

Characteristics
- Operator: Arriva TrainCare

History
- Opened: 1963

Tyne Yard (TY) is a railway yard in Birtley, England, on the East Coast Main Line, operated by Arriva TrainCare. The yard is the major freight yard of the North East, with the majority of rail freight movements in Tyne and Wear from around Great Britain passing through the yard.

== History ==
Tyne marshalling yard was part of the 1955 modernisation plan by British Railways, and was opened up to traffic in 1963. Part of the southern end of the yard was built on the former Lamesley railway station.

The yard is 4 miles (6.4 km) south of Newcastle upon Tyne railway station, between Team Valley and the town of Birtley. It is visible from trains passing on the adjacent East Coast Main Line, with the yard located on the western side of the line. As of 2015, it is a major hub for the Network Rail High Output renewals programme. At least one High Output train is based here at any time. As of October 2016, there is a High Output Ballast Cleaner (HOBC) and Track Replacement System (TRS) serviced and maintained in the down primaries.

The yard has nine staging sidings, seven of which are under overhead lines, engineering sidings, carriage sidings, three departure roads, and the primaries which house the Network Rail centre and virtual quarry / spoil heap. The old signal box was demolished in 2015, the radio mast sometime before this.

There is a Freightliner train crew depot here which is for the signing on of Freightliner train crew based in Tyne Yard.

The yard also acts as a servicing point for railtours visiting the region, and the Smithy Lane road bridge over the northern end of the Yard is a popular location for railway photography.

The Angel of the North is visible from the yard and main line on the high ground to the east.

From 2019, the yard was used as a storage location for Class 800/801 Azuma units of LNER and also of Class 802 Paragon units of Hull Trains.

More recently, Grand Central uses Tyne Yard for light servicing to their Class 180 Adelante fleet that operate between Sunderland and London King’s Cross.

== See also ==
- List of rail yards
- Rail transport in Great Britain
