= Willington =

Willington may refer to:

== Places ==
=== In England ===
- Willington, Bedfordshire
- Willington, Cheshire
- Willington, County Durham
  - Willington A.F.C., football club
- Willington, Derbyshire
  - Willington Power Station, former coal-fired station
- Willington, Kent
- Willington, Tyne and Wear
- Willington, Warwickshire
- Willington Quay, North Tyneside
  - Willington Athletic F.C., former football club

=== In the United States ===
- Willington, Connecticut
- Willington, South Carolina

== People ==
- Aaron Smith Willington (1781–1862), American journalist and newspaper editor
- Avis Willington (born 1956), British Olympic swimmer
- Daniel Willington (1942–2025), Argentine footballer
- Sally Willington (1931–2008), English activist, artist and potter
- Willington Ortiz (born 1952), Colombian footballer
- Willington Techera (born 1985), Uruguayan footballer

== Other uses ==
- Willington railway station, Derbyshire, England
- Willington railway station (Bedfordshire), England, a former station
- Willington railway station (Durham), England, a former station
- Willington School, Wimbledon, London

== See also ==
- Wellington (disambiguation)
