= Techera =

Techera is a surname. Notable people with the surname include:

- Cristian Techera (born 1992), Uruguayan footballer
- Jonathan Techera (born 1989), Uruguayan footballer
- Rubén Techera (born 1946), Uruguayan footballer
- Willington Techera (born 1985), Uruguayan footballer

== See also ==
- Teixeira
