= Kevin Rudd (rugby league) =

Former professional rugby league player, coach and administrator

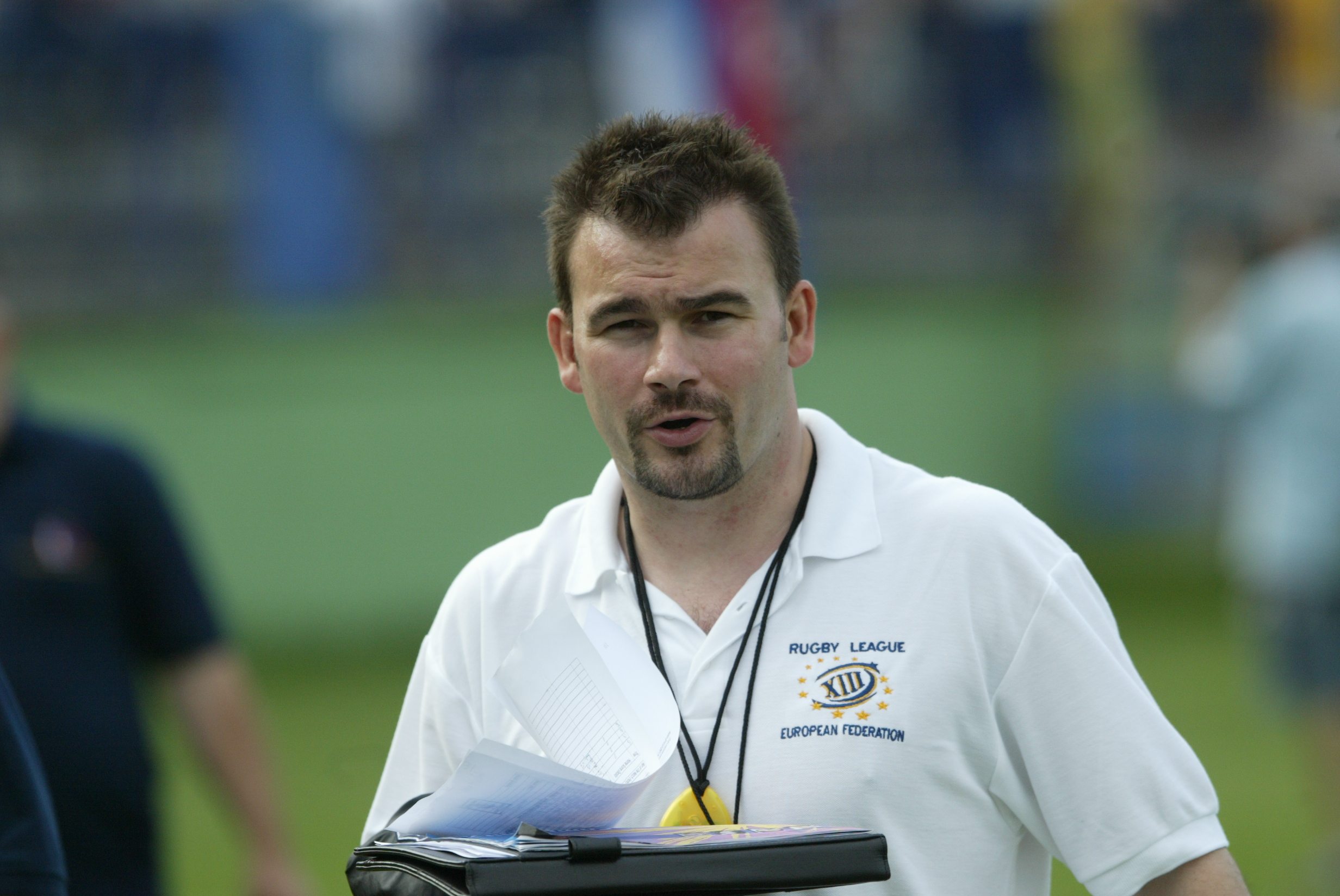
Kevin Rudd, pictured on duty for the RLEF as Tournament Director of European Under 16s-Serbia, 2009

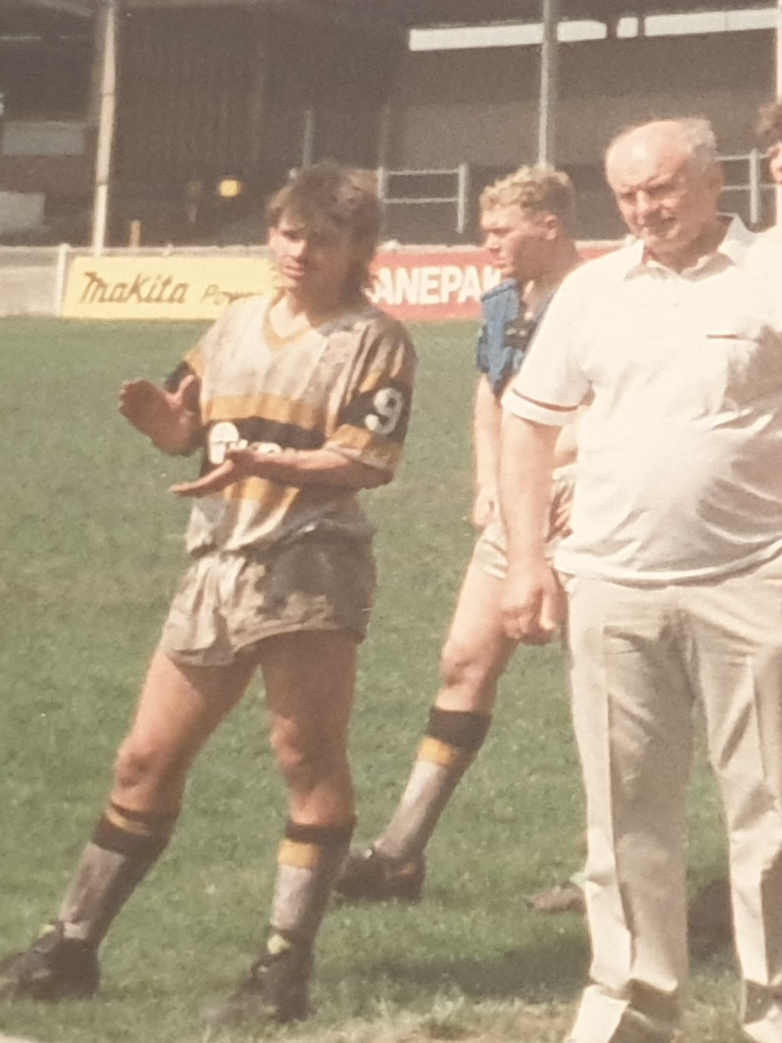
Kevin Rudd, player for Castleford Colts, with team coach Dennis Hartley, 1988

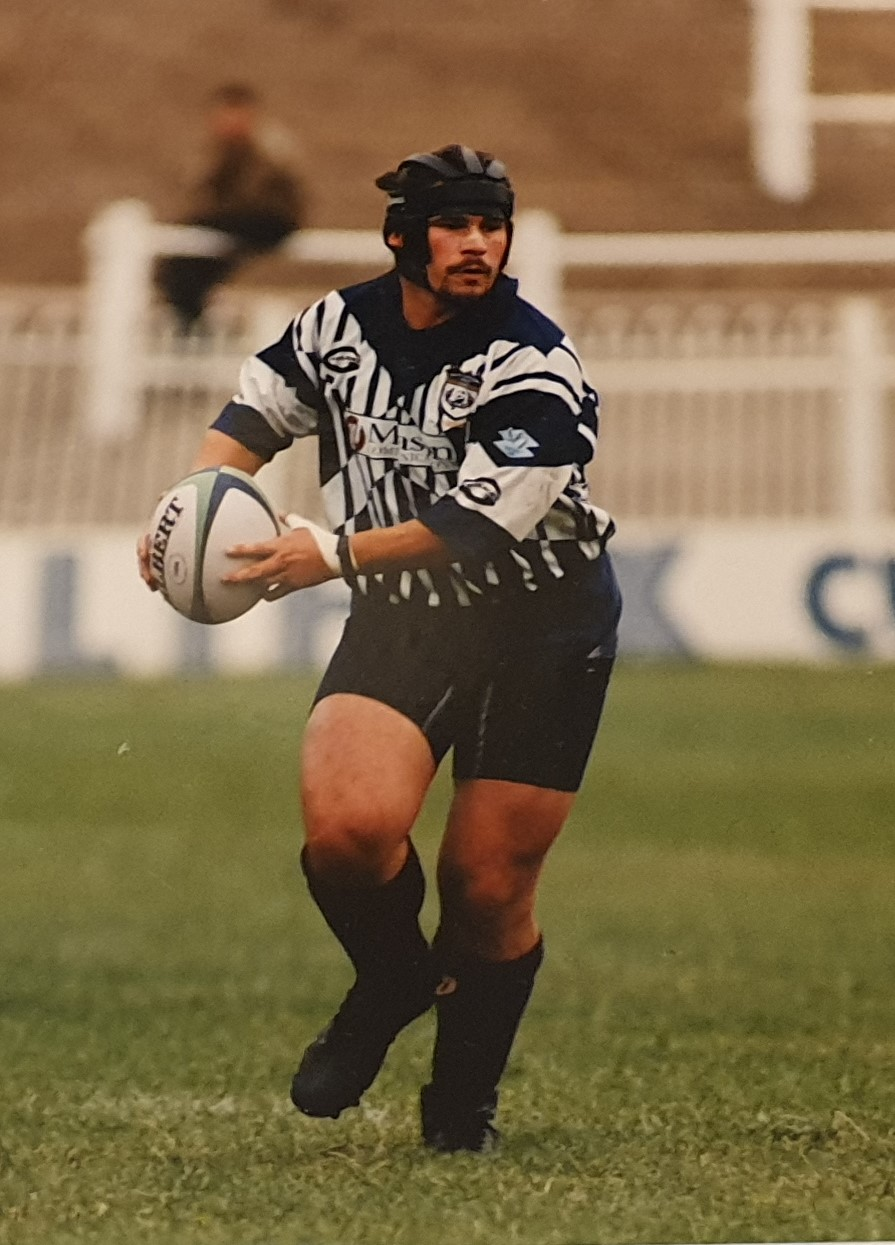
Kevin Rudd, representing the Scottish national team, at the Rugby League Halifax Student World Cup, 1996

Kevin Rudd (born on 9 October 1971, in Garforth), is a former professional rugby player, coach and administrator for the Rugby League. Rudd was the first Executive Officer for the Rugby League European Federation. He is a former player and coach for Scotland Students and Scotland ‘A’ teams. He was a director of Rugby and Development for Scotland R.L for the pathway leading to the National Team. He is also a former Assistant Team Manager for the Scotland Rugby League National Team. He has concurrently developed a career as a mechanical engineer in the cement industry and is founder and director of UK based cement consulting firm, Independent Cement Consultants (ICC).

== Background ==
Rudd was born in Garforth, Yorkshire, UK. He describes himself as mixed race, his Dad being a Geordie from Eighton Banks and his Mum a Mackam from Boldon Colliery, Sunderland.

== Rugby league ==
=== Playing career ===
Rudd, a hooker, started his professional career as a player with Castleford in the late 1980s'. He was coached by the great Dennis Hartley. During his studies at Nottingham Trent University he played for the University student side, Midlands Universities (coached by the founder of Scotland Students R.L Malcom Reid), Nottingham City as well as for the Cambridge Eagles, playing in the fledgling London League, during his industrial placement year. After completing his studies in Nottingham, he returned to Garforth and represented Doncaster and Hull KR, as well as local amateur Club Lock Lane. From 1996, once he moved to Dunbar, on the east coast of Scotland for his first major engineering post, he played for several Scottish sides including the first club side in Scotland, the Forth & Clyde Nomads in 1996 and as captain for the Edinburgh Eagles in 1998 and 1999. He continued his studies in Scotland, graduating with an MBA at Edinburgh University in 1998. In 1996 he represented the Scottish National Student team at the Halifax Student World Cup, coached by former Welsh International John Risman, where Rudd was named player of the tournament for the Scottish side. He represented the Scottish team again at the 1999 Independent Student Rugby League World Cup as well as playing for Scotland ‘A’. During the 1990s and 2000s he had played for so many different teams he became known in the rugby league world as 'a man who has played for more teams and countries than anyone known in the history of rugby league' as was quoted in Dave Hadfield's in book, Learning Curve: The story of Student Rugby League.

=== Coaching and management career ===
In 1998 Rudd took on the role of Scotland Rugby League Director of Rugby and Development Manager, responsible for the player pathway leading to the Scotland National Rugby League Team. He was manager and coach for the Scotland Students' Team until 2003, part of the first national Management Team to defeat France in France in 2003. He also became coach of the Scotland A team as well as Assistant Team Manager for the Scottish National Team, part of the first national Management Team to defeat France in France in 2003.

In 2004 Rudd was appointed as the first Executive Officer for the Rugby League European Federation. In the five years until he resigned from the post in 2009, Rudd was given the task of promoting the sport across the continent. This role took him to many countries, including Georgia, Czech Republic, Jamaica, Serbia, Italy Pakistan, Russia, Lebanon, Morocco, Ukraine, Netherlands, Latvia and Germany to mention a few, where he worked to create new teams and cooperation between nations. He was responsible for establishing the European B and C Championships, which have been played annually since 2006 by second and third tier nations. During these championships he was occasionally asked to step in as referee.

=== Volunteering ===
Rudd continues to train juniors as volunteer Head Coach at his local club: Elmbridge Eagles Rugby League Club and is the secretary of the London Junior League. Rudd also continues to coach on the Junior regional representative programme, the first stepping stone towards a career in playing professional Rugby League in the London region.

== Mechanical engineering career ==
=== Education and early career ===
Rudd graduated from Nottingham Trent University with a BEng in Mechanical Engineering in 1994. During his industrial placement year he was trained on the job by specialist engineers whilst involved in the precision engineering task of building Sizewell B nuclear reactor. He graduated from Leeds University with an Msc. in 1995 and attained an MBA at Edinburgh University in 1998.

=== Cement industry ===
After graduating with an MSc in Production Management, Rudd commenced his career in the cement industry as trainee engineer for Blue Circle Cement in Scotland. He moved up through the ranks to become a Country Manager for Blue Circle, Project Director at Lafarge and WS Atkins. He is currently a specialist consultant and Director for heavy industry consultancy, Independent Cement Consultants (ICC).

=== IMechE fellow ===
In 2013 Rudd was elected Fellow of the Institution of Mechanical Engineers. He is currently the only member from within the UK cement industry to have this title.

=== Expert witness ===
Rudd is a registered international expert witness, serving the cement and other heavy industries.
