= Norman Hunter (footballer) =

English footballer (1943–2020)

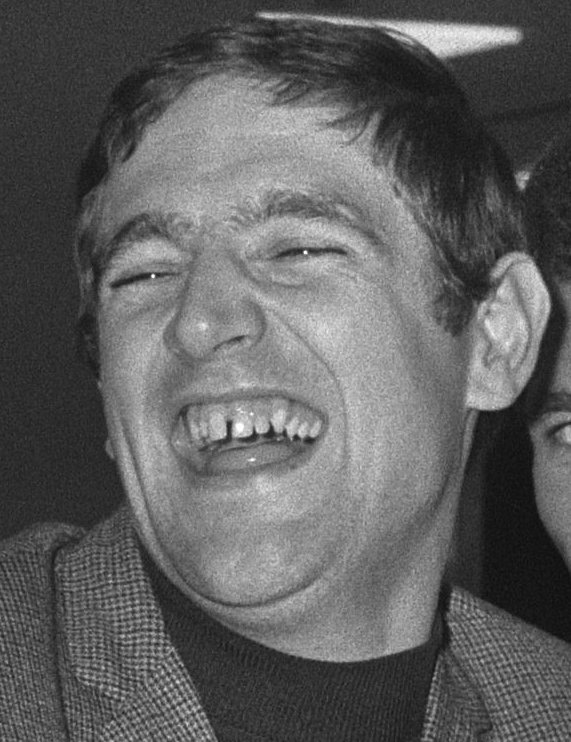
- Hunter in 1969

Personal information
- Full name: Norman Hunter
- Date of birth: 29 October 1943
- Place of birth: Eighton Banks, County Durham, England
- Date of death: 17 April 2020 (aged 76)
- Place of death: Leeds, West Yorkshire, England
- Position: Centre-back

Youth career
- 1959–1962: Leeds United

Senior career*
Years	Team	Apps	(Gls)
1962–1976	Leeds United	540	(18)
1976–1979	Bristol City	108	(4)
1979–1982	Barnsley	31	(0)
Total		679	(22)

International career
1964–1969	Football League	6	(0)
1964–1965	England U23	3	(0)
1965–1974	England	28	(2)

Managerial career
- 1980–1984: Barnsley
- 1985–1987: Rotherham United
Medal record
Men's football
Representing England
FIFA World Cup
Winner	1966
UEFA European Championship
Third place	1968
- * Club domestic league appearances and goals

Norman Hunter (29 October 1943 – 17 April 2020) was an English professional footballer who played for Leeds United, Bristol City, Barnsley and the England national team. He also managed Barnsley and Rotherham United. A tough tackling centre-back and defensive midfielder, he won two League Championship medals and one FA Cup-winners medal with Leeds, for whom he played 726 games in total, scoring 21 goals.

Hunter played in 28 full internationals for England, scoring twice. He was a member of England's 1966 FIFA World Cup winning squad but, as understudy to Bobby Moore, he did not play in the tournament. He was the first winner of the PFA Players' Player of the Year award in 1974, and was included in the Football League 100 Legends, published in 1998.

An early victim of COVID-19 when the pandemic began in 2020, Hunter was admitted to hospital on 10 April after testing positive. He died of the disease a week later, aged 76. On 23 April, Leeds United announced that the South Stand at its Elland Road stadium would be renamed the Norman Hunter South Stand in his honour.

== Early life ==
Norman Hunter was born on 29 October 1943 at Eighton Banks, County Durham. His father, Norman senior, died before he was born. Hunter and his brother Robert were brought up by their mother, Betty, with the help of her sister and two football-playing uncles. He attended Eighton Banks Primary School till he was eleven and then went to Birtley Secondary Modern School till he was 15. He played junior football throughout his school years and, in his autobiography, recalled how one teacher tried to make him become a right-footed player. However, another teacher realised that Hunter had real potential as a left-footed player and encouraged him to develop his natural game. He joined Birtley Juniors FC and had played in only a few games before he was spotted by a talent scout working for Leeds United. After playing in a trial match for Leeds United Juniors against Bradford Park Avenue Juniors, Hunter was invited to join the ground staff at Elland Road. He had just left school and gave up a job as an electrical fitter to pursue his football career.

== Playing career ==
=== Leeds United ===
==== Ground staff to First Division ====
Leeds were in the First Division when Hunter arrived at Elland Road in the summer of 1959. The team manager was Jack Taylor, who had taken over from Bill Lambton on 1 May 1959. Lambton had signed Don Revie from Sunderland in November 1958 and Billy Bremner, a Scottish Schoolboys international, soon afterwards.

Leeds had been promoted from the Second Division in 1955–56, the season in which Jack Charlton became a first team regular, but they had struggled since John Charles left in May 1957, and were relegated after the 1959–60 season. In March 1961, with the team in the lower half of the Second Division table, Taylor resigned and Revie took over as player-manager until March 1962 when he retired as a player and became the full-time manager. This was significant for young players like Hunter and Bremner because Revie initiated a youth development policy which was the basis of the club's future success. Among those who graduated were Paul Reaney, Peter Lorimer, Terry Cooper, Eddie Gray, and Paul Madeley.

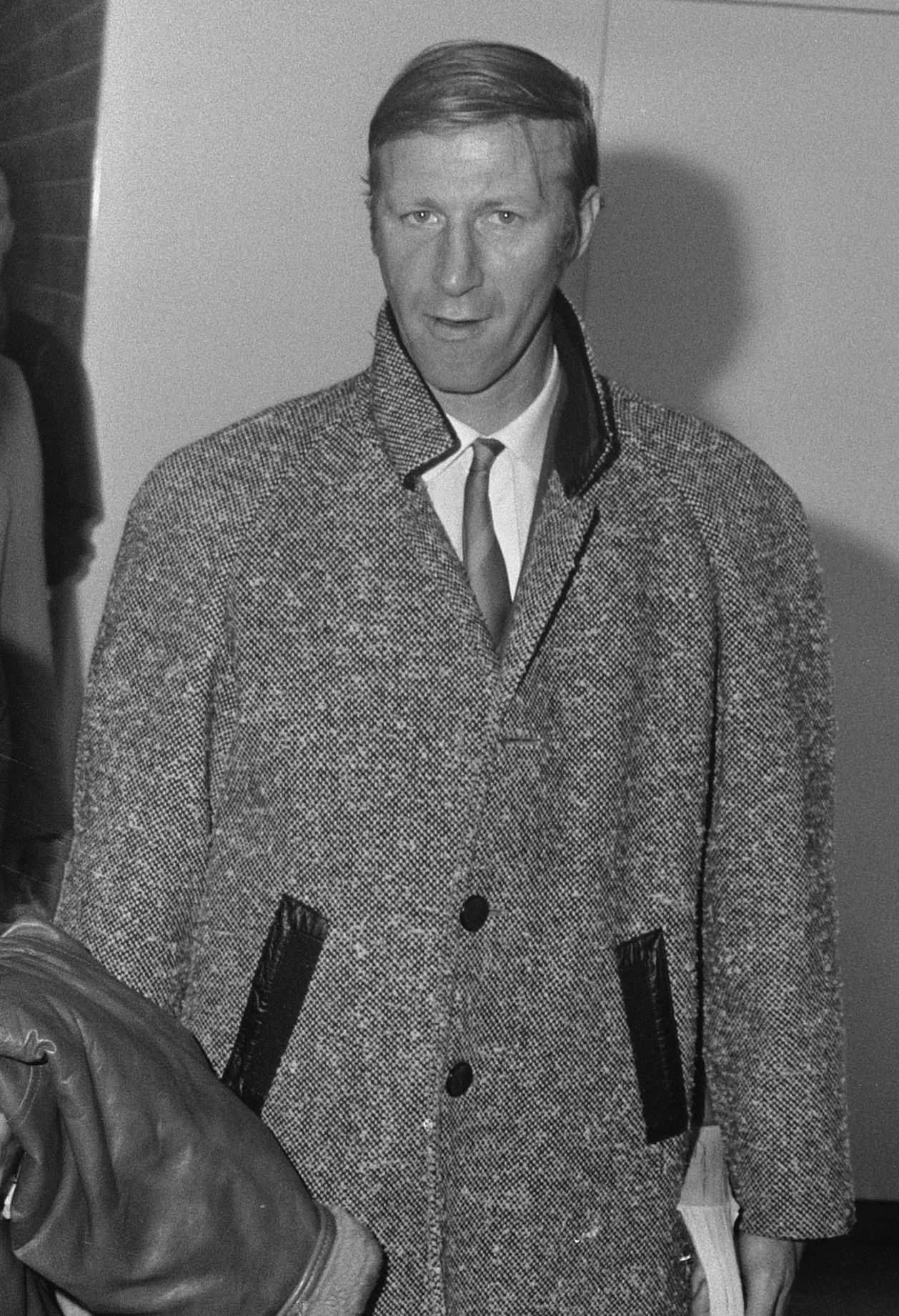
Jack Charlton in 1969

Hunter's graduation was in the 1962–63 season when Revie promoted him to the first team. He and Paul Reaney made their debuts in a Second Division match against Swansea Town at Vetch Field on 8 September 1962, Leeds winning 2–0. Hunter formed a central defence partnership with Jack Charlton which lasted for over a decade. Leeds finished fifth in 1962–63, Hunter playing in 36 of their 42 matches, and then won the Second Division title in 1963–64, Hunter playing in all 42 matches. Leeds returned to the First Division where, for the rest of Hunter's career with them, they were one of the strongest and most competitive teams in both English and European football. Hunter was a consistent performer, playing in over forty matches per season from 1962–63 to 1974–75; and was an ever-present in five seasons.

==== 1964–65 ====
Hunter made an immediate impact on the First Division in 1964–65 and, only two months into the season on 28 October 1964 (the day before his 21st birthday), he was selected to play for the Football League XI against the Irish League XI in Belfast. The Football League XI won 4–0. A week later, he made his debut for the England under-23 (u-23) team against Wales u-23 on the Racecourse Ground in Wrexham. His Leeds team-mate, goalkeeper Gary Sprake, was playing for Wales u-23. England won 3–2.

Although they were newly promoted, Leeds had an exceptional season in 1964–65 and performed a "runners-up double" by finishing second in the league to Manchester United on goal average; and losing 2–1, after extra time, to Liverpool in the 1965 FA Cup final. Hunter made 51 appearances for Leeds in all competitions, missing only one league match. He also played in three matches for the England u-23s and two for the Football League XI.

==== 1965–66 ====
Leeds began the 1965–66 season with a home match against Sunderland on 21 August 1965. They did not play well and struggled to break the Sunderland defence, even after George Mulhall was sent off in the second half. Four minutes from time, the ball ran loose in the Sunderland penalty area and Hunter, running forward in support, met it near the penalty spot and volleyed home to give Leeds a 1–0 win.

Hunter continued to play a key role in the Leeds defence and his form impressed England manager Alf Ramsey, who included him in the squad for a match against Spain at the Santiago Bernabéu Stadium in Madrid on 8 December 1965. Hunter was a substitute and he replaced Joe Baker in the 43rd minute, thereby making his full international debut. He played as a defensive midfielder and that allowed Ramsey to deploy both Bobby Charlton and Alan Ball in more attacking roles as England won 2–0.

Leeds did well in the league again and were runners-up to Liverpool, albeit six points adrift. They gained 55 points from their 42 matches, the same as Burnley with Leeds having the better goal average. Hunter played in 41 of the 42 League matches and scored five goals, his highest total in a single season. Leeds had less success in the two domestic cup competitions, losing 4–2 at home to West Bromwich Albion in the third round of the League Cup (West Brom went on to win the tournament); and losing 1–0 to Chelsea at Stamford Bridge in the fourth round of the FA Cup. Leeds had qualified for the 1965–66 Inter-Cities Fairs Cup and progressed to the semi-finals with Hunter an ever-present in their eleven matches. They had victories over Torino (2–1 on aggregate), SC Leipzig (2–1), Valencia (2–1), and Újpesti Dózsa (5–2). In the semi-final, they drew 2–2 on aggregate with Real Zaragoza but lost the replay 3–1.

==== 1966 to 1973 ====
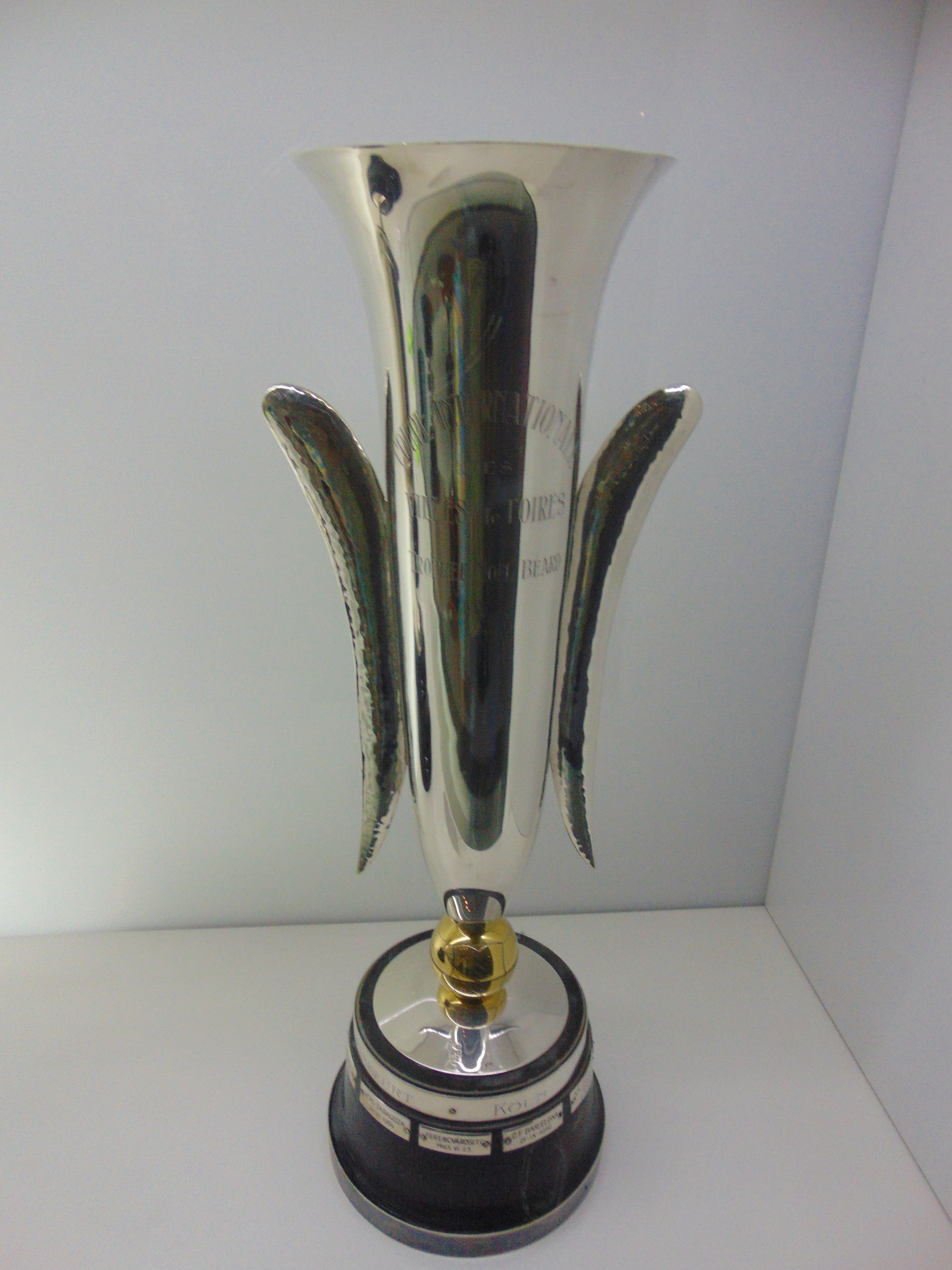
The Inter-Cities Fairs Cup. Hunter played in three finals, winning twice.

Hunter was a key player for Leeds throughout this period as they became one of the strongest teams in Europe by reaching five European finals while he played for them. They qualified for the Inter-Cities Fairs Cup again in 1966–67 and this time reached the two-leg final against Dinamo Zagreb. Hunter played in both matches but Leeds lost 2–0 on aggregate.

Leeds won both the Football League Cup and the Fairs Cup in 1967–68. In the League Cup final at Wembley Stadium, they met Arsenal and won the match with a goal scored by Terry Cooper after 20 minutes. The match was reported as a "poor do", and as a "a drab and dull game for the neutrals", but it was one in which Hunter excelled as he and Cooper were rated its best players. Hunter's performance was described as "distinguished".

In the 1967–68 Fairs Cup, Leeds reached the final following successive wins against Scotland's Hibernian, Rangers, and Dundee. The two-legged final was against Hungary's Ferencváros, who were rated a "crack outfit" and "probably [Leeds'] biggest test yet". They had defeated Liverpool en route to the final. In the first leg at Elland Road, Ferencváros played a defensive game and their coach said before the match that "a draw will suit us in Leeds". Hunter came close to scoring early on but Leeds struggled to capitalise on their attacking opportunities. Mick Jones scored the only goal of the match in the 41st minute. Leeds were not expected to win the second leg in Budapest. The match was played only three weeks after the Warsaw Pact invasion of Czechoslovakia and, as Hungarian forces had been involved, there were concerns that the match might be cancelled. Ferencváros had to play their normal attacking game in this match and the Leeds defence, including Hunter, faced "its sternest test yet". They held on and the match was goalless, so Leeds won their first European trophy.

Leeds won the League Championship for the first time in 1969, finishing six points ahead of Liverpool and losing only twice. Hunter played in all 42 league matches. In 1970–71, Leeds won the Fairs Cup again, defeating Juventus on the away goals rule in the two-leg final. The aggregate score was 3–3 after the teams drew 2–2 in Turin and 1–1 at Elland Road. Hunter and Jack Charlton were outstanding for Leeds in the first leg, in which they had to contain Helmut Haller, Roberto Bettega, Franco Causio, and Pietro Anastasi, who at the time was the world's most expensive footballer. In his report of the Elland Road match, Phil Brown of the Yorkshire Evening Post wrote:

It took a tremendous effort for United to maintain this double effort. Even Norman Hunter was looking weary and that above all else shows the amount of strain United have been through because if there is an iron man in British football today it is Norman Hunter.

Before the 1972 FA Cup final at Wembley, some Leeds fans displayed a banner reading 'Norman Bites Yer Legs' and, after ITV had screened it several times, Hunter was thereafter nicknamed "Bites Yer Legs". He eventually met the fans who created the banner and "had a laugh about it". He remarked that there had been jokes about the banner ever since, such as his wife saying: "Norman's come home today with a damaged leg"; and the response: "Oh, yes, who does it belong to?"

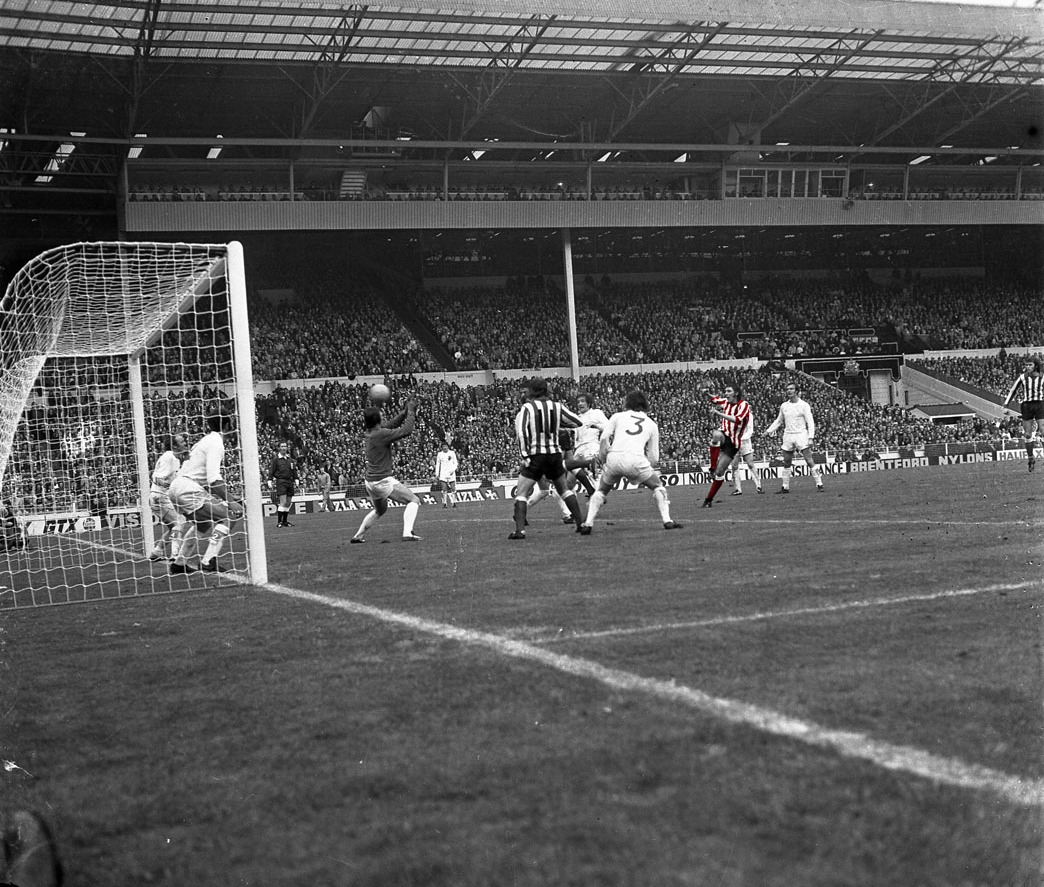
Sunderland's Ian Porterfield scoring the winning goal at Wembley in the 1973 FA Cup final. Hunter can be seen between players 11 and 3, trying to block the shot.

In Hunter's autobiography, he remarked on the disappointment of having been on the losing side in an FA Cup final and was determined that Leeds would win the 1972 final, commenting that he was "really wound up for it". They defeated Arsenal 1–0 with a goal by Allan Clarke and there is a photograph of Hunter leaping into the air to celebrate the goal being scored. At the end of the game, Hunter climbed the steps to the Royal box twice; once to collect his own medal, and then again to help Mick Jones negotiate his way up and down, as Jones had been receiving treatment for a dislocated elbow while his teammates had been getting their prizes.

In May 1973, Hunter was on the losing team in two finals. In the FA Cup final at Wembley, Leeds surprisingly lost 1–0 to Sunderland, who were then in the Second Division. A few days later, Leeds were defeated 1–0 by AC Milan in the European Cup Winners' Cup final at the Kaftanzoglio Stadium in Thessaloniki. Hunter was sent off for retaliation and the game was over-shadowed by rumours of match-fixing.

==== 1973 to 1976 ====
In the 1973–74 season, Leeds were unbeaten in their first 29 matches, an achievement that enabled them to hold off a strong Liverpool challenge and win the League Championship, giving Hunter his second League winners medal. On 20 October, having played his 600th match for Leeds, he was presented with a silver salver before the home match against Liverpool. Both teams formed a guard of honour. Hunter then produced a performance described as "quite splendid" to help Leeds defeat their closest rivals 1–0, the goal scored by Mick Jones. At the end of the season, Hunter was the first winner of the PFA Players' Player of the Year award.

As champions, Leeds entered the European Cup the following season, and Hunter was a member of the team that reached the 1975 European Cup final but lost 2–0 to Bayern Munich.

Towards the end of his career with Leeds, Hunter was in their team for a league match against Derby County at the Baseball Ground on 1 November 1975. Derby won the match 3–2 but it is remembered for a fistfight between Hunter and Derby's Francis Lee. Hunter was outraged when Lee won a first half penalty by allegedly taking a dive to fool the referee into thinking Hunter had fouled him. Charlie George scored the penalty to give Derby a 2–1 lead. In the second half, Hunter deliberately provoked Lee with a late tackle. Lee retaliated and Hunter punched him in the mouth, causing a lip injury that needed stitches. The referee sent both players off but Lee attacked Hunter again as they walked towards the touchline. Hunter was knocked down and several players and officials were needed to stop the fight which was shown on Match of the Day that night. In 2003, the incident was selected by The Observer as 'sport's most spectacular dismissal'.

=== Bristol City ===
Having made 540 Football League appearances for Leeds, and 726 in all competitions, Hunter signed for Bristol City on 28 October 1976 for £40,000. City had just been promoted back to the First Division after an absence of 65 years. Hunter played in 108 league matches for them till the end of the 1978–79 season. He scored four goals and was the club's player of the season in both 1976–77 and 1977–78. In Hunter's three seasons, City finished 19th, 17th, and 13th in the First Division. They won only two of eight English cup ties, but they did win the 1977–78 Anglo-Scottish Cup, beating St Mirren 3–2 in the final.

=== Barnsley ===
Hunter finished his playing career at Barnsley, who had just been promoted from the Fourth Division to the Third when he joined them in June 1979. Barnsley's manager was Allan Clarke, one of Hunter's former Leeds team-mates. Hunter made 24 league appearances in 1979–80 and Barnsley finished 11th. Returning to Leeds, Clarke departed at the end of the season and Hunter replaced him as team manager, initially as a player-manager. He played in just six matches in 1980–81 and led Barnsley to promotion as Division Three runners-up. Hunter then retired from playing to concentrate on management, but he did make one additional league appearance in 1982–83 because of an injury crisis.

== International career ==
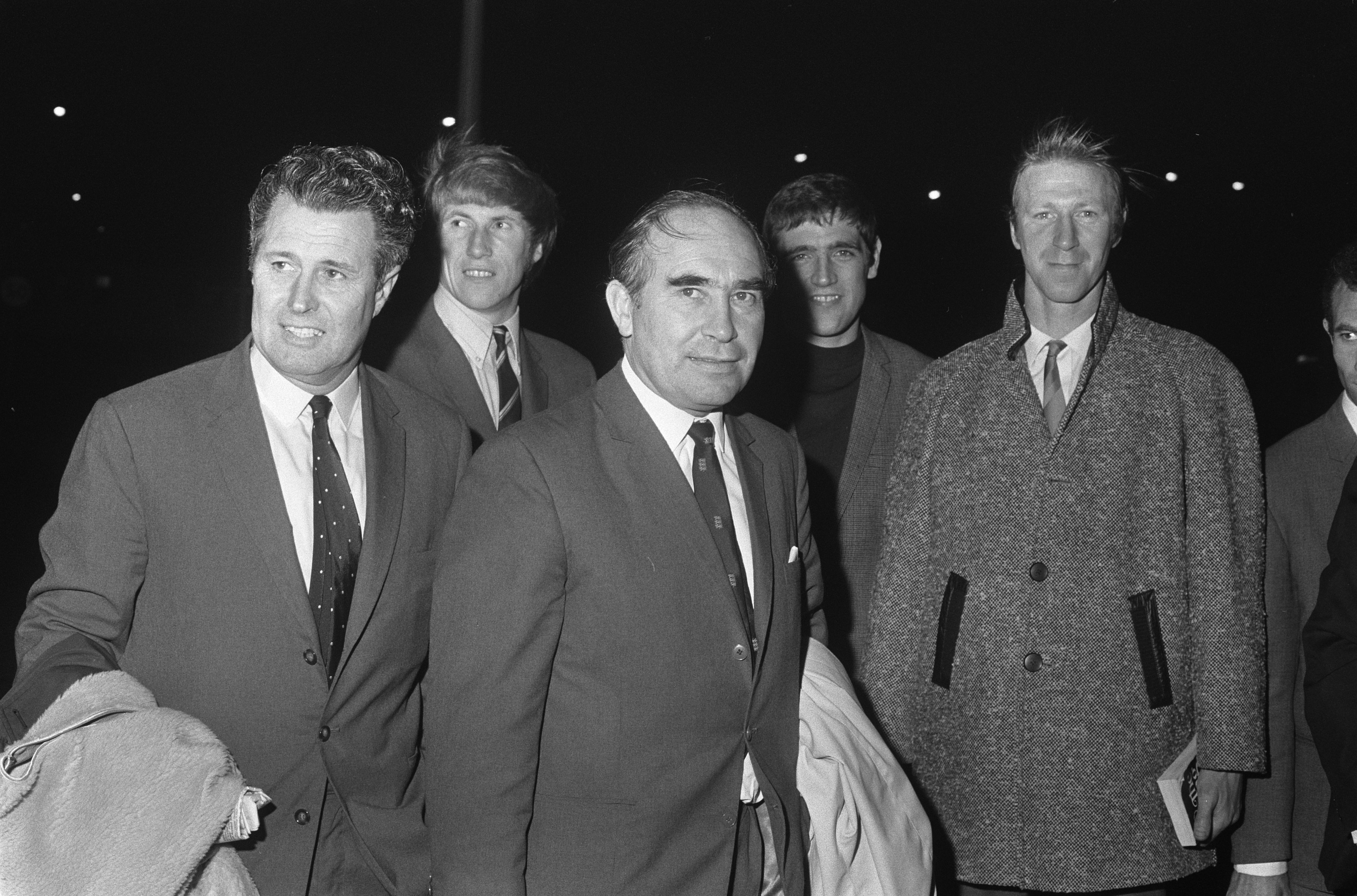
The England squad arrives at Schiphol Airport, November 1969. L–R: Harold Shepherdson, Colin Bell, Alf Ramsey, Norman Hunter, Jack Charlton.

Hunter played three games for the England under-23 team before he was given his debut for the England team. On 8 December 1965, England played Spain in Madrid, and Hunter made his debut after coming on as a substitute.

The established partnership between Jack Charlton and Bobby Moore meant that Hunter spent much of his international career as an understudy to Moore; he won 28 caps in total. He was in the squad which won the 1966 FIFA World Cup but did not play in any of the matches.

Hunter scored the winning goal against Spain in England's quarter-final qualifying round for the 1968 European Championship, he then started in both the 1–0 semi final defeat to Yugoslavia and the 2–0 victory over the Soviet Union in the bronze medal match. He spent a short part of the 1970 season injured but he was in Alf Ramsey's squad for the summer's World Cup in Mexico, however his only appearance in the tournament was coming on as a late substitute in the 3–2 defeat by West Germany.

In 1973, Hunter was in the England team which needed to win their last qualifying tie for the 1974 World Cup in West Germany. The opposition at Wembley were Poland, who just needed a draw to qualify at England's expense. It was 0–0 when Hunter went to make a tackle, but instead trod on the ball and lost it. Poland quickly made a counter-attack allowing Grzegorz Lato to run clear and set up Jan Domarski to score. Allan Clarke equalised with a penalty but England could not score again, and the 1–1 draw saw them miss out on a place at the World Cup.

In addition to his international appearances, Hunter played for The Football League XI six times. In these matches, from October 1964 to September 1969, he played against similar teams representing Ireland (3), Scotland (2) and Belgium. The Football League won all three of the matches against the Irish League; drew 2–2 with the Belgian League; and drew one and lost one against the Scottish League. On 11 June 1967, he travelled to Montreal with the Football Association XI to play in an exhibition match against Borussia Dortmund as part of an Expo International Tournament. The FA XI won 3–2 and Hunter scored the winning goal.

== Playing style and personality ==
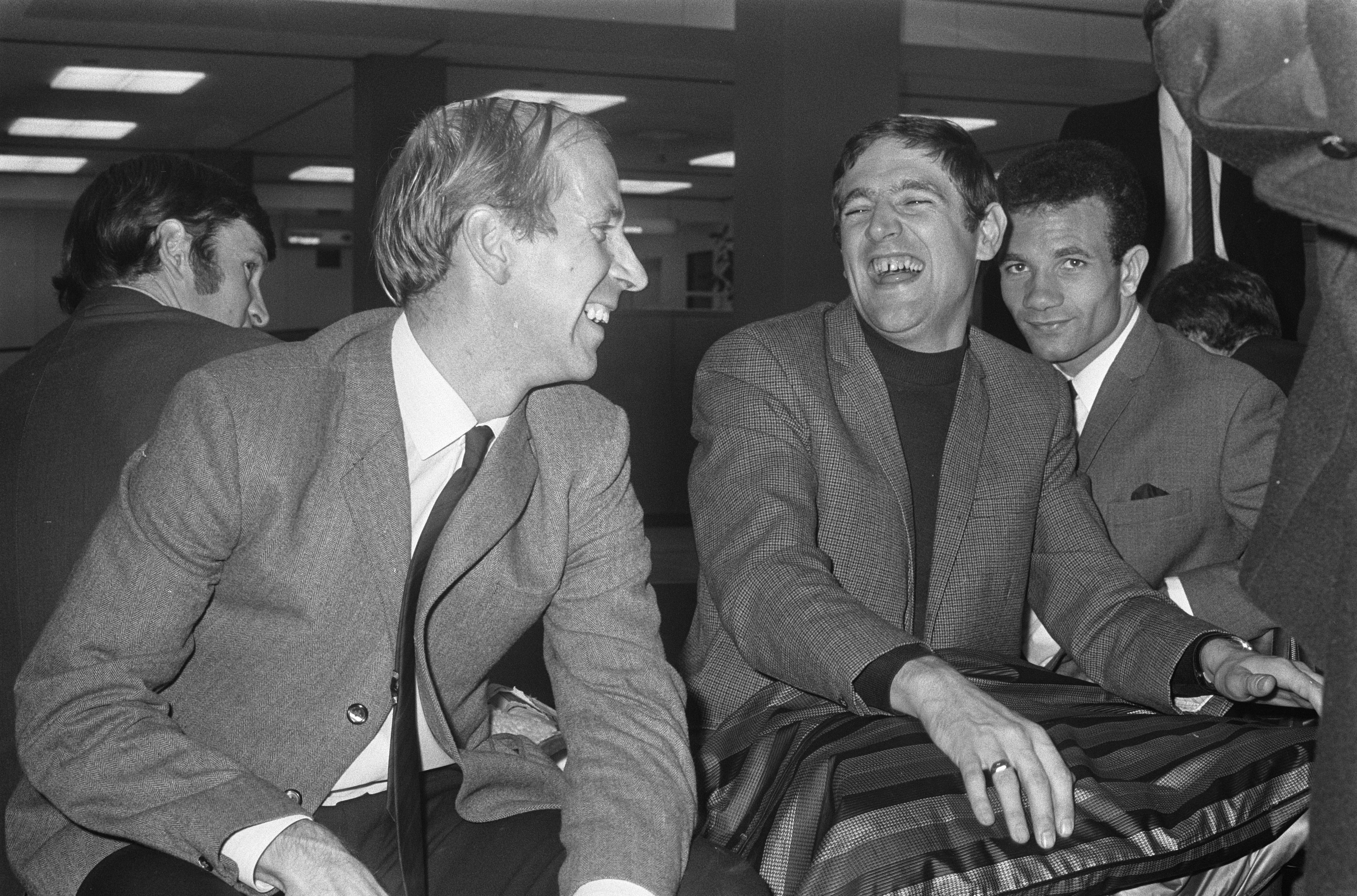
Norman Hunter (centre) with Bobby Charlton (left) and Paul Reaney in 1969.

As Don Revie explained at some length in a tribute to Hunter for his 1974–75 testimonial at Leeds, Hunter's job was to win the ball and move it forward. Revie pointed out that Hunter could read the game so that he was invariably well-positioned, and would win the ball by performing committed and uncompromising tackles when necessary. Aware that Hunter was widely perceived to be a physical player only, Revie emphasised that Hunter had good ball control and his passing was accurate, so he was actually a very skilful player.

Like his contemporaries Tommy "Anfield Iron" Smith of Liverpool, Nobby Stiles of Manchester United and Ron "Chopper" Harris of Chelsea, Hunter always had the reputation of being a hard man on the field. However, he said in his autobiography that, of the four, only Smith was "naturally tough" – Harris, Stiles and Hunter himself were all, he said, "laid back off the field". (Hunter and Smith were close friends.)

When Hunter died, his long-time Leeds team-mate Eddie Gray directed attention to his skill as a player by saying:

Norman was a truly great football player. A lot of great players have walked through the gates of Elland Road and Norman was right up there with the best of them. It's a sad day for everybody connected with the club. He was a great reader of the game, great left foot, great passer, so influential in our team.

Revie described Hunter as "the most honest person I've ever met" and also pointed out the warmth of his personality. Revie remarked on the level of Hunter's competitive spirit in any type of sport or game, not just football. Hunter, he said, "only plays one way – to win".

== Management and coaching ==
=== Manager of Barnsley ===
Hunter was appointed Barnsley manager on 16 September 1980 after Allan Clarke left to take over as manager of Leeds United. Initially a player-manager, Hunter achieved promotion to the Second Division in his debut season, 1980–81, after Barnsley finished second. The team did well in 1981–82, finishing in sixth place and only four points shy of promotion. They had a fine run of success in the 1981–82 Football League Cup and reached the quarter-finals after a 1–0 home win against Manchester City. In that round, they were drawn away to Liverpool and produced a surprise result by drawing 0–0 against the European champions at Anfield. The tie went to a replay at Oakwell where Barnsley scored first, through Colin Walker after 21 minutes. Their hopes of glory were dashed, however, as Graeme Souness equalised before half-time and then Liverpool scored twice in the last ten minutes, with goals by David Johnson and Kenny Dalglish, to win 1–3 (Liverpool went on to win the competition).

Barnsley did less well in 1982–83, but still finished a creditable tenth in the Second Division. In 1983–84, they struggled to avoid relegation and Hunter was sacked on 8 February 1984 after a 3–2 home defeat by Cardiff City. Barnsley did not forget Hunter's promotion season and, following his death in 2020, he was inducted into the club's Oakwell Hall of Fame; Clarke was inducted on the same day.

=== Manager of Rotherham United ===
Hunter's next job was as a coach at West Bromwich Albion for part of the 1984–85 season. The manager there was Johnny Giles, another of his former Leeds team-mates. However, Hunter was fully settled in Yorkshire and found the travel to and from Birmingham too much, so he resigned.

He was appointed manager of Third Division Rotherham United on 24 June 1985. Rotherham, known as the 'Millers', had finished twelfth in 1984–85. They hoped that Hunter could lead a push for promotion in 1985–86, but the team were not up to the task and finished 14th. They had a good run in the FA Cup with big home wins in the first two rounds against Wolves (6–0) and Burnley (4–1). In the third round, they were drawn away against non-league Frickley Athletic and won 3–1, but the run ended in the fourth round with a trip to Arsenal where they were beaten 5–1.

Rotherham did not improve in 1986–87 and again finished 14th. They lost to Chester City in the first round of the FA Cup. Things got much worse in 1987–88. Rotherham struggled from the start of the season and, at the beginning of December, were in the relegation zone. Then, on 6 December, the 'Millers' had one of the worst defeats in their history when they were beaten 4–0 by non-league Macclesfield Town in the second round of the FA Cup. Three days later, Hunter was sacked.

Hunter said that going to Bristol City was one of his best decisions, but going to Rotherham was the worst. For much of his time there, he had only nine professionals and, when he did buy a few players, the board sold them on. His two years at Rotherham were, he said, "the least enjoyable of my entire football career".

=== Coach at Leeds and Bradford ===
In 1988, Hunter was employed as a coach at Leeds under Billy Bremner, but he was dismissed upon the appointment of Howard Wilkinson as manager on 10 October that year. His final job in football was as first team coach to Terry Yorath at Bradford City from 13 March 1989 but was sacked on 19 February 1990.

== Personal life and later years ==
=== Family and post-football activity ===
On 11 June 1968, Hunter married Sue Harper and the couple had two children, Michael and Claire. After leaving Bradford City, Hunter turned to the after-dinner circuit recounting his anecdotes and, from 1993 to 2020, he worked for local stations BBC Radio Leeds and Yorkshire Radio as a match summariser. Hunter retained close links with Leeds United and its fans. He regularly attended Leeds matches and participated in club-hosted conferences and events; the eponymous "Norman Hunter Suite" is located in the West Stand at Elland Road.

=== Awards ===
In 1998, the Football League, as part of its centenary season celebrations, included Hunter in its list of 100 League Legends. He released his autobiography, Biting Talk, in 2004. In November 2007, following a campaign led by The FA, members of England's 1966 World Cup squad who did not play in the final, including Hunter, were belatedly awarded winner's medals by FIFA. Hunter was presented with his medal by Gordon Brown during a ceremony at 10 Downing Street on 10 June 2009.

=== The Damned United ===
In March 2009, Tom Hooper's film The Damned United was released. Based on David Peace's 2006 book, The Damned Utd, it dramatised Brian Clough's ill-fated 44 days as manager of Leeds United in 1974. Hunter was portrayed by character actor Mark Cameron in a supporting role. The film and the book have been slammed for historical inaccuracies and misrepresentation of characters. Both have been the subject of litigation: Johnny Giles successfully sued the book's publishers for libel; Dave Mackay won an apology and undisclosed damages from the makers of the film. The World Soccer review says, as an aside to Giles' legal action: 'Norman Hunter hardly says anything [in the book], but he's still alive so escapes Peace's hatchet job'.

Clough's family were disgusted by the book and boycotted the film; friends of the family heavily criticised the film's portrayal of Clough. Hunter is depicted as a dark and moody character who, in one scene, assaults Clough during a training session. Joe Jordan has categorically denied that such an incident ever happened and says of the whole drama: 'There were just too many inaccuracies, too many people were saying things they didn't say, and doing things they didn't do'. The film's negative portrayal of Hunter is sharply at odds with his real off-the-field persona, evidenced by the many tributes paid to him before and after his death, as 'an amiable, popular and lovable man'. Hunter was one of the contributors to Phil Rostron's retaliatory We Are the Damned United, published in August 2009, which sought to set the record straight about Leeds under Clough.

=== Illness and death ===
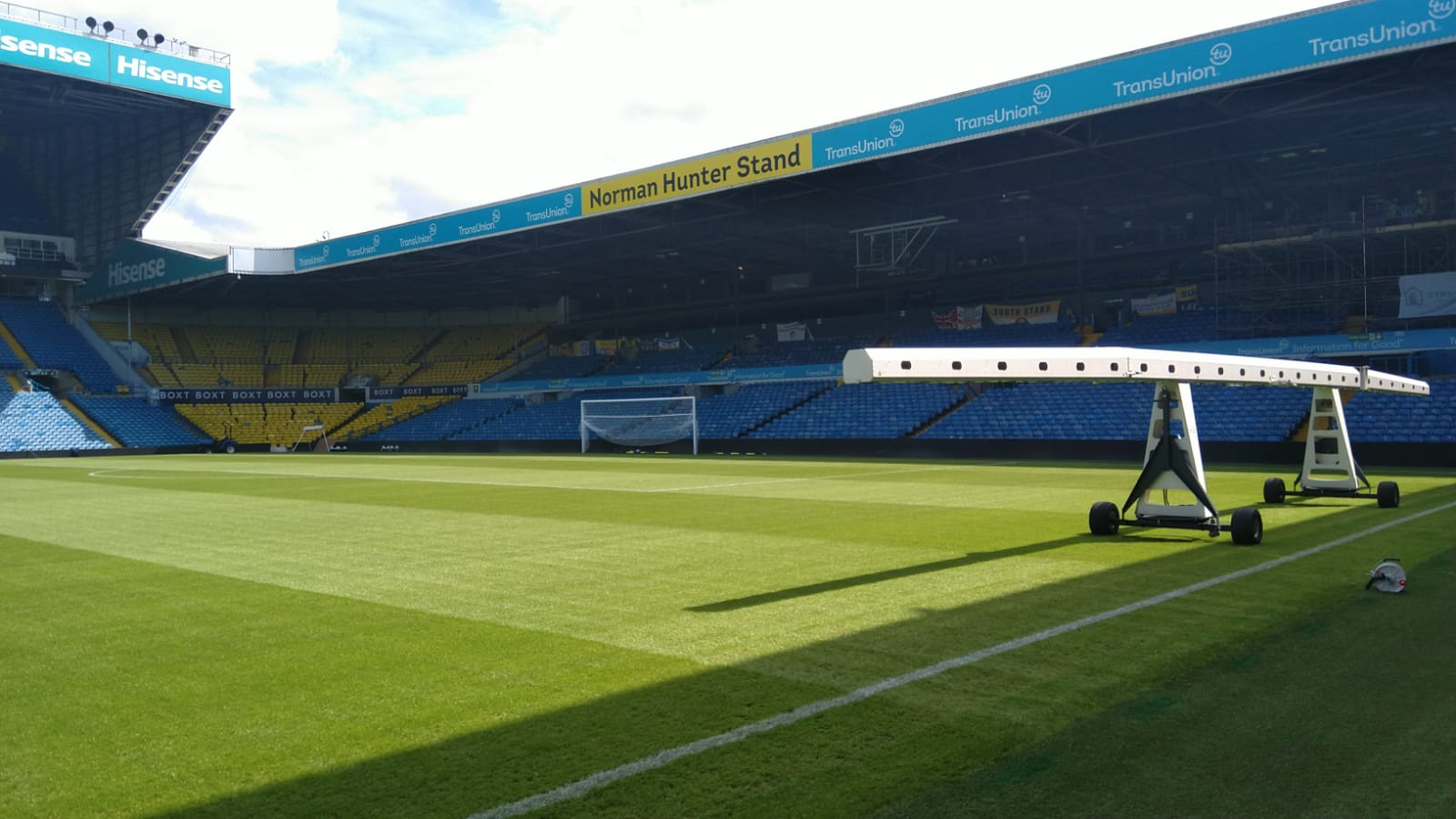
The Norman Hunter South Stand at Elland Road

In 2013, Hunter was diagnosed with rare cancer type Chronic Lymphocytic Leukaemia (CLL), which attacks blood and bone marrow. He received treatment for the rest of his life at the Leeds Cancer Centre.

On 10 April 2020, it was reported that Hunter was being treated in hospital after testing positive for COVID-19. On 16 April, a bulletin said he was 'severely unwell'. The following day, Leeds United announced that Hunter had died from the virus, aged 76, stating that '[his death] leaves a huge hole in the Leeds United family [and] his legacy will never be forgotten'. The club announced on 23 April that the South Stand at Elland Road would be renamed in his honour as the Norman Hunter South Stand.

In June 2021, Hunter's family began the Norman Hunter Golf Day in his honour. This is an annual charity event at Horsforth Golf Club, where Hunter held membership, to raise funds for CLL cancer research in Leeds. In its first three years, the event raised £112,368. In May 2024, ahead of that year's event, Norman's wife Sue told Leeds Hospitals Charity that she was delighted with the response to the events and hoped the funds raised would help to revolutionise CLL treatment.

== Honours ==
Leeds United

- Football League First Division: 1968–69, 1973–74
- Football League Second Division: 1963–64
- FA Cup: 1971–72; runner-up: 1964–65, 1969–70, 1972–73
- Football League Cup: 1967–68
- FA Charity Shield: 1969
- Inter-Cities Fairs Cup: 1967–68, 1970–71; runner-up: 1966–67
- European Cup runner-up: 1974–75
- European Cup Winners' Cup runner-up: 1972–73

England

- FIFA World Cup: 1966
- UEFA European Championship third-place: 1968

Individual

- PFA Players' Player of the Year: 1973–74
- PFA Team of the Year: 1973–74
- Football League 100 Legends: 1998
