= Willington railway station (disambiguation) =

Willington railway station serves Willington, Derbyshire, England.

Willington railway station may also refer to:

- Willington railway station (Bedfordshire), a former station in Willington, Bedfordshire, England
- Willington railway station (Durham), a former station in Willington, Durham, England

== See also ==
- Willington (disambiguation)
