= The Birtley Belgians =

Belgians employed by the British Arms industry in WW1

The Birtley Belgians emigrated from Belgium to Birtley in what is now Gateshead, Tyne & Wear but was then County Durham (Britain) during World War I to create an armaments factory. In the early stages of the War, British authorities realised that the national armaments production would not produce the number and quality needed to fight the German Imperial Army. A 1915 shell shortage was reported in the papers, and the ensuing crisis contributed to bringing down the government of H.H. Asquith. The new government commissioned armament factories throughout Britain, although the challenge of staffing these factories remained high. The British recruited Belgians, known for their excellent armament factories, to man the plant in Birtley.

They were housed in a temporary village adjacent to Birtley, named Elisabethville after the then queen of the Belgians.

== The Great War ==
Despite long-term preparations for war, in 1914, the British army was ill-equipped to mount the extended and protracted war of defense in France. Half of the British army of 400,000 were billeted overseas at various garrisons throughout the empire; the remaining quarter million territorial guards and cavalry. It was an entirely volunteer and mostly urban force. These were the men who formed in 1914 the British Expeditionary Force (BEF), also called the Old Contemptibles. Despite German "contempt" (hence the name, Old Contemptibles), the BEF managed to shore up the manpower on western Front and earned the grudging respect of the French and Belgians.

The offensive strategy in military vogue since the 1870s did not prepare the British army for the long-term needs of a war of attrition but instead focused on the construction of, for example, capital ships. By late 1915, ammunition supplies were so reduced that the Commander in Chief of the British army, John French ordered that the big guns not fire more than ten shells in a day. The news of the British army's shortages and the failure of the Gallipoli Campaign contributed to restructuring of the Government to include the Unionist (conservative) members of government. A new Government of National Unity at once appointed David Lloyd George as the new Minister of Munitions, and his department set about building munitions factories throughout the country, including one next to the little village of Birtley in County Durham, just south of Newcastle upon Tyne, commissioning the ship and automobile manufacturer Armstrong-Whitworth of Tyneside to construct and run it and a neighbouring cartridge factory. One large problem arose, however – finding people to work in them, seeing that most British munitions workers were by 1915 enlisted, trained and serving at the various fronts, while most of the female workforce was already in employment in other factories and as landgirls.

== Approach to Belgium ==
By the end of October 1914, the German army had successfully invaded and secured most of Belgium; the Allied forces, mostly British ships, had blockaded Belgium from the sea. The Belgian army of 117,000 men had succeeded in holding up the German Army seven times its size for three months; the Belgians who had survived were evacuated to Britain or their units absorbed into other fighting forces.

Prior to the war, Belgium was regarded as the foremost European country for the manufacture of armaments. Its Sillon industriel, or industrial valley, was one of the first fully industrialized and mechanized regions in Europe. The Poudreries Réunies de Belgique was among the oldest armament manufacturers on the Continent, known for its manufacture of mortars, artillery shells, and land mines. Graham Spicer, an official in the Ministry of Munitions who had worked in Belgium before the war and knew its armaments manufacturing capabilities, suggested that perhaps the Belgians might be able to help. An approach was made, and the result was that 1000 skilled Belgian armaments workers volunteered help train other volunteers. As the result of another suggestion (possibly from Spicer as well) most of these volunteers were drawn from the pool of soldiers who had been badly wounded at the front and declared unfit to return there; they were not so unfit they could not do a job of work, but were not capable of resuming life at the Front.

British authorities quickly realised that these men could not just be dumped into any old armaments factory because of two problems – the obvious one of language (most Belgian soldiers spoke little or no English) and totally different working practices. Thus, it was decided to man one or two of the factories with only Belgians and put purely Belgian management teams in charge, with a British supervisory team alongside to monitor the financial aspects of the job. After all, it was the British government who was paying for everything, even if the Belgian government was finding the workers. Birtley was chosen as one of these sites.

Day-to-day control passed from Armstrong-Whitworth to a Belgian management team led by M Hubert Debauche, Director-General until the outbreak of war of a large and well-known iron and steel manufacturing firm in Gilly, near Charleroi, Belgium. The British firm was not pleased by this about-face, although it was allowed to keep the cartridge factory, and seems to have done all it could to be unhelpful from then on, as an unpublished report taken from the private archives of Hubert Debauche suggests.

== New munitions factory ==
Late in 1915 several hundred Belgians made their way from military hospitals in France, Belgium and England to the factory at Birtley, County Durham, to begin their work. Over the next few months their numbers steadily grew until there were about 3500 of them.

After many delays due limited production began at the end of 1915 but only got into full swing in the spring of 1916, producing 5”, 6” and 8” shells of several types for the British Government.

Conditions in the factory were not agreeable, however. The main problem was that several foremen and departmental heads regarded workers as still being in the army – which they were, but only in theory, since most had been officially ‘discharged’ as unfit for active service at the front. These bosses ruled the workshops under the full might of military law. One of the main clauses of that military law insisted the men should wear military uniform at all times. ‘At all times’ meant everywhere except in the home – on the streets of the village, going out into Birtley itself (with appropriate military pass) and above all at work, even if that necessitated working for hours on end next to one of the furnaces operating at several hundred degrees.

Another section of the law provided that whenever men left the camp, they had to wear full uniform – even if they were just going along the road to have a drink and meet English friends in one of the pubs in Birtley. The catch was that, apart from most of the pubs in Birtley being out of bounds in any case (as agreed jointly by the British and Belgian authorities – to prevent over-indulgence or too much ‘hob-nobbing’ with the natives), the Belgian soldier was not supposed to enter a British pub in uniform! Moreover, the British police seem to have been extremely worried about violent confrontations between the locals and the Belgians, ignoring the fact that violent confrontation had long been a normal feature of life in Birtley, especially at weekends. Furthermore, there was not always harmony within the colony or the factory themselves. Worker-management lines also divided along the long-standing antipathy between the Dutch-speaking Flemish workers and the French-speaking Walloon management of the community.

Throughout 1916 morale in the factory went slowly downhill, but nothing was done to alleviate the problem, although consultations were going on between Whitehall and Birtley on how best to deal with any unrest that might occur in the factory. Another problem was that in practice the Colony was policed by Belgian gendarmes but in theory they were working under British rule of law, very different from their own. As just one example, back home the gendarmes were allowed to carry pistols at all times: here they were not allowed to be armed except under special circumstances and only then with the approval of the British police. Finally, on 20 December 1916, it all came to a head. One of the workers went to see Captain Algrain, Military Head of Security, to obtain four days leave, to which he was entitled. Suddenly the captain noticed that the man, though wearing his regulation uniform, was sporting a civilian cap. Enraged at this ‘breach of discipline’, he had the man sent directly to the cells for four days, to join two others who had attempted to leave the camp in civvies. The rest of the workforce quickly got to hear about this unjust act.

That evening the alerted gendarmes saw a large crowd of about 2000 men making its angry way towards the gendarmerie. The fence around it was torn down and a hail of palings and stones crashed through the windows, causing a few minor casualties and creating panic among the gendarmes. A full-scale riot was only averted by the arrival of local British police and representatives of the British management team, who managed to calm the workers. It was agreed to set up a commission of enquiry into all complaints, common sense prevailed and peace was restored. No blame was apportioned, but Captain Algrain was replaced as Head of Security by a Captain Commandant Noterman. Hubert Debauche wrote later that he thought Algrain too young to hold such a responsible position.

From then on the workers devoted themselves much more readily to the task for which they had volunteered. For almost three years these ‘war-wounded’ worked day and night shifts – one week days, next week nights – in conditions of extreme heat and noise. (There was no Factories Act in those days). Camille Fabry, who worked in the factory from January 1917 until the Armistice, wrote in his book ‘Nos Hors-combat à Elisabethville-Birtley’ says:

A visit to the workshops always makes a deep impression. At the forges hirsute men, stripped to the waist, move rapidly and methodically in front of the ovens. The bars of iron, heated to an exact temperature, are swallowed by the presses and moulded into the desired shape in a second. The rough form of a shell, glowing bright red, and carrying on its flank the first identification marks, is then rolled towards the yard, like a beautiful but terrible toy, a friend of the graves. As soon as the shell has cooled enough, skilful hands take it, smooth and polish it, and finish it to perfection. But it was dangerous work, and the hospital had a steady stream of ‘work-wounded’ to deal with, some minor, some much more serious. As an example, here is part of the story of one man.
Franciscus Peeters was employed in the ammunition factory to help maintain the machinery. One day he went to inspect the interior of one of the machines on the shell-shop. The current was supposed to be switched off at his request, but for some reason his colleague failed to do so. The machine suddenly started up and ripped his left arm off instantly. It is amazing he survived, but he did. Because of his handicap he was given the choice between a lump sum (unknown amount) or a monthly payment. Seeing the difficult circumstances he chooses the first solution. (He also became the projectionist for the camp cinema).

== New village ==
Not all of these men could be billeted on Birtley, so it was agreed to build a village alongside the factory, to be administered, like the factory, by a Belgian Head of Village, in this case a military man, Captain Algrain, with a British counterpart, a civilian called Mr A E Prowse.

The Colony (as the Belgians called it) was laid out somewhat on the lines of a garden city with broad streets and open spaces and was provided with a grocer and butcher, several other shops based in people’s homes; a Roman Catholic church; a 100-bed hospital; a laundry and bathhouse. There was also a school for about 600 pupils. There was a sovereign British Sub-Post Office, on sovereign Belgian soil, selling British stamps and postal orders, etc., but staffed by Belgian postal workers. There was also a football pitch. The swimming team made use of the River Wear. For live entertainment of various sorts, the colonists had the use of the Birtley Hall, in peace-time the village's cinema and theatre. There was little need for the Belgians to go into Birtley.

At the same time, the British and Belgian governments set about re-uniting the married men with their families (many of these had been forced to flee Belgium in the face of the German onslaught) through a variety of relief agencies established by all sorts of philanthropic groups. In the course of time, a Belgian ‘colony’ of well over 6000 people was established alongside the British village of Birtley.

The rented accommodation provided consisted of sturdy prefabricated wooden buildings, either barrack blocks for the single men or terraced houses for families. These had hot and cold running water, electric lighting, and even indoor toilets, which differed from most housing in Birtley and the homes they had been forced to abandon back in Belgium. One soldier wrote:

Life isn't bad in the blocks. Our soldiers, well acquainted with the pleasures of barrack-room floors and the soothing mud of the trenches, hardly ever complain about the conditions here. It's not perfect, but at least it's comfortable.

The canteen for the single workers provided meals with a choice of starter, main course and pudding, at a modest cost. Two teams of cooks kept the single men fed. Married men were expected to return home to be fed.

== Activities ==
The men had a limited amount of spare time. Officially they had in theory twelve hours each day off work, but during that period they had to have their rest and meals, plus (in many cases) spare time for their families.

Despite this, they formed a variety of activities – literary, musical, dramatic and sporting, etc. ‘It is well known, even in Britain, that the Belgian is a founder of societies. In this field plurality is not forbidden!’ wrote Fabry.

There were forty-plus members of the camp symphony orchestra, the brass band, dramatic societies, football, and swimming teams. Moreover, the various music groups and sporting societies were soon to be found performing in various parts of Northeast England.

It must also be mentioned that quite a few of these men were not just enthusiastic amateurs but had been ‘professionals’ in their field before the war; there were quite a few sportsmen who had represented their country for instance, even at Olympic level. Then there were those like Raoul Bailleux, a theatre director in Brussels before the war, who during his time in the Colony wrote, produced and directed a number of ‘entertainments’ for the delectation of the Colony. Not to mention Camille Fabry, whom we have already met, a well-known poet and writer with a number of books to his name before the war.

It is even more amazing however that all these societies had but one main aim behind their various activities, apart that is from enjoying themselves, which was to raise money for wartime charities, to help orphans, war-widows, refugee families, disabled soldiers, prisoners of war; or even to buy new boots for soldiers serving in the trenches. As Fabry puts it:

‘Each of the many different societies in Elisabethville has a character all its own, yet a common basis: philanthropy. We need recreation, but of a sort that helps the unfortunate’.

The total amount raised probably equates to hundreds of thousands of pounds today, if not millions.

== Armistice and after ==
With the 1918 Armistice the Belgians were quickly repatriated.

The village became a ghost town, quickly taken over by the local poor and homeless, while the factory was partly sold off as individual units. In the 1930s the work of demolishing the village began, to make way for new council houses. Further redevelopment of the site after World War II removed more traces, including the school, a prefabricated building estimated to have a working life of ten years yet in constant use for sixty-three. Now all that is left of the whole project is two blocks that were once the food-store and the butcher’s (both now listed buildings but still under threat of demolition), and several of the original sheds on the factory site.

The Colony's cemetery has survived, and there are now new grave headstones of the thirteen soldiers who died in Elisabethville, with a monument erected in 2005 in the nearby municipal cemetery to commemorate their deaths. There are also two graves of Belgian soldiers in the churchyard of the nearby Catholic church of St Joseph's.

The central street is still named Elisabeth Avenue, although the other streets have been renamed.
