= Team Valley =

Trading estate in Gateshead, England

Coordinates: 54.9323°N 1.6189°W

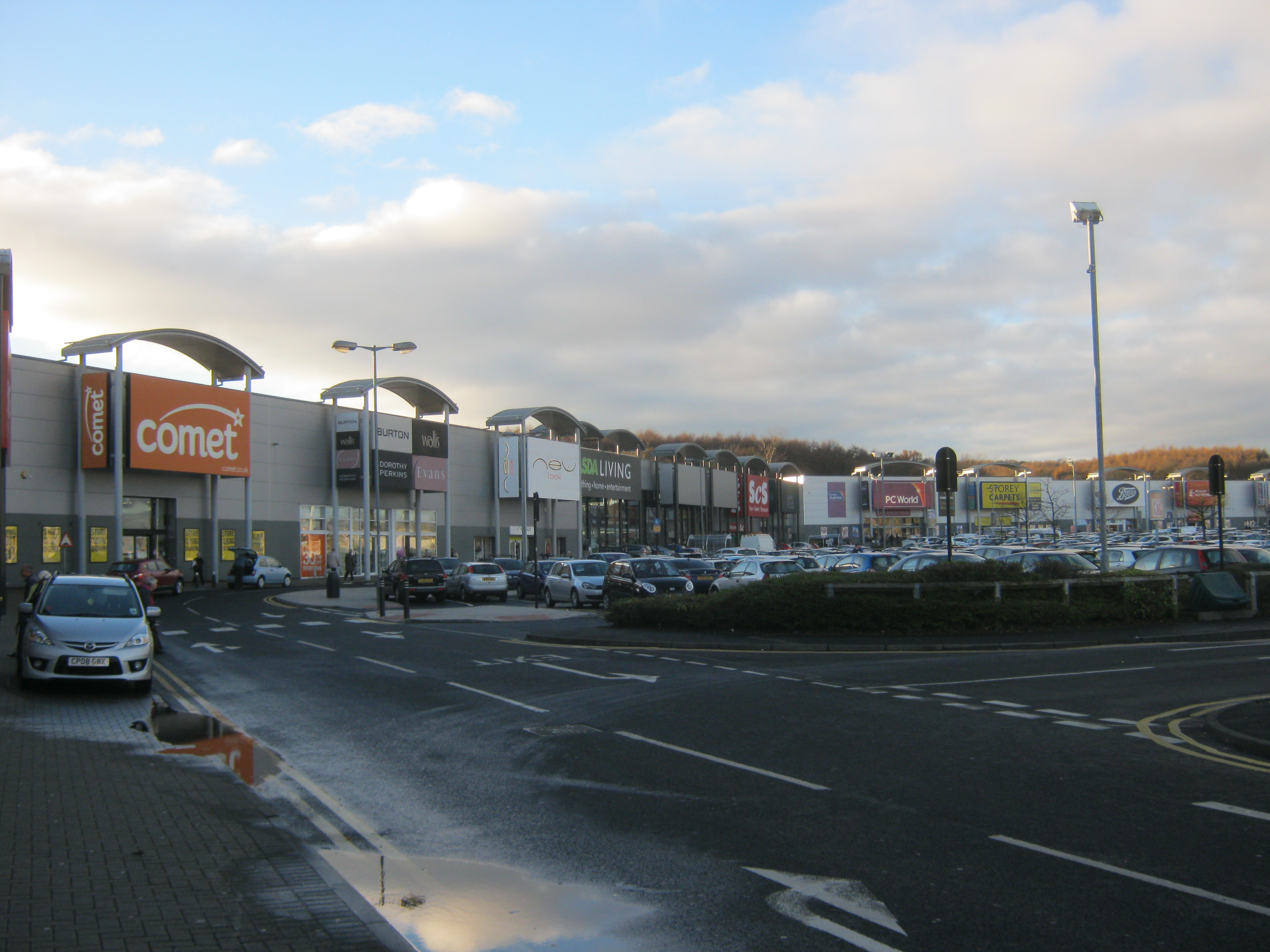
Team Valley Retail World

Team Valley is a trading estate in Gateshead, north-east England. It is home to the Retail World retail park, with many large, international companies based in the area's trading estate. In 2017, there were approximately 700 companies on the estate, employing approximately 20,000 people.

The residential area known as the Teams is adjacent to Dunston.

== History ==
In the 1930s, the government decided to spend nearly £2 million on this part of Gateshead, establishing the Team Valley Trading Estate as a well-planned industrial environment owned by North Eastern Trading Estates Ltd. The architect in charge was William Holford, with Hugh Beaver as chief engineer.

It included a central headquarters, now used by English Partnerships, a bank, post office, and some modestly scaled industrial buildings, as well as some smaller industrial units for start-up ventures.

These facilities were laid out along a wide central artery, known as Kingsway, almost two miles (3.2 km) long. Work on the estate began in May 1936, and the first factory opened in the October of that year. The construction, which was undertaken by Wimpey Construction, took several years, and was completed in 1938.

The estate was officially opened by King George VI on 22 February 1939.

The southern end used of the Team Valley was the former location of the National Coal Board's regional headquarters. However, following the closure of the mines in the area, this was replaced by a Safeway supermarket (now Sainsbury's).

The River Team runs directly through the centre of the trading estate, hidden in a culvert.

== Transport ==
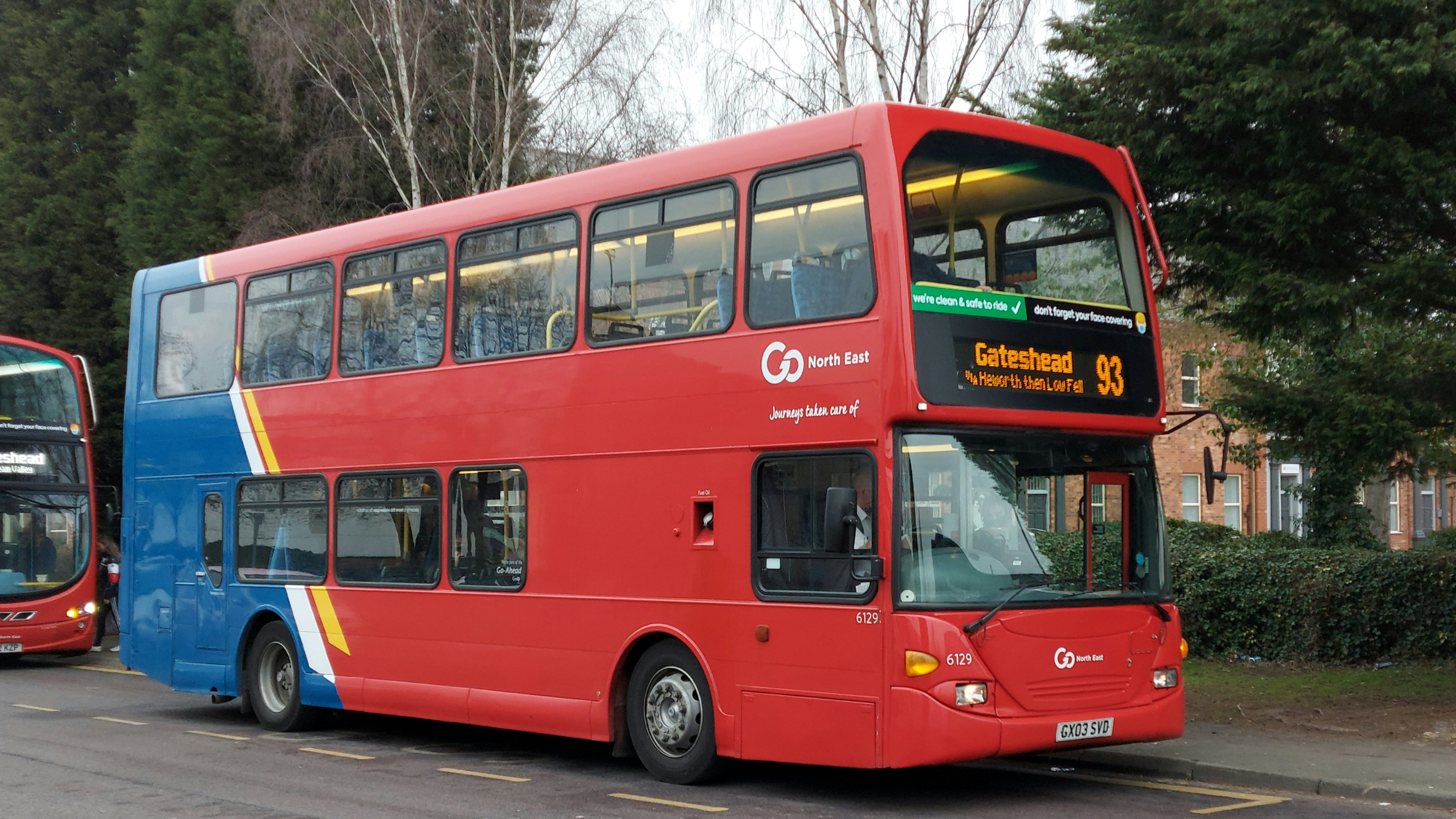
Go North East 6129 operating the 93 to Gateshead at Team Valley Retail Park

To the east, the Team Valley is bordered by the East Coast Main Line – the main railway line between London, York, Newcastle upon Tyne and Edinburgh. Until 1952, the area was served by a rail station at Low Fell.

Currently, the nearest rail station is Dunston, as well as the Tyne & Wear Metro being accessible at Gateshead Interchange.

Local bus company Go North East serve Team Valley with their regular 93 and 94 Gateshead loop services. Nexus subsidises peak-time services that include: 90, 91, 929, 933, 937, 939 and 941.

== Sources ==
- Taylor, Simon; Lovie, David B (2004). Gateshead. Architecture in a changing English urban landscape. London: English Heritage. ISBN 1 873592 76 0.
- White, Valerie (1980). Wimpey: The first hundred years. George Wimpey.
