= Birtley railway station =

Disused railway station in Birtley, Tyne and Wear

Birtley
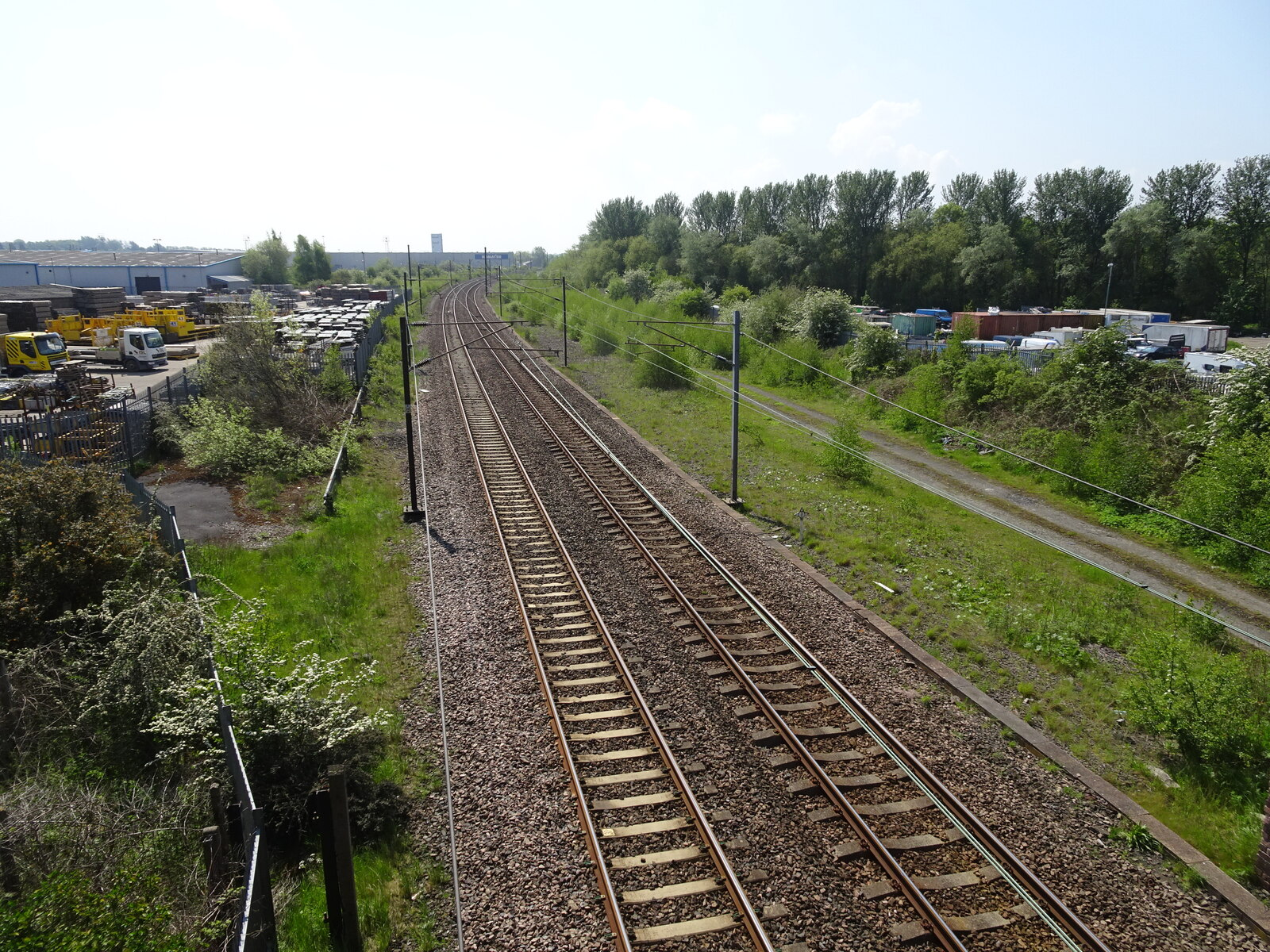
- The site of the station in 2021

General information
- Location: Birtley, Metropolitan Borough of Gateshead, Tyne and Wear; England
- Coordinates: 54.8944°N 1.5852°W
- Grid reference: NZ267556
- Platforms: 4

Other information
- Status: Disused

History
- Original company: North Eastern Railway
- Pre-grouping: North Eastern Railway
- Post-grouping: LNER; British Railways (North Eastern)

Key dates
- 1 December 1868: Opened
- 5 December 1955: Closed
Location

Birtley railway station served the town of Birtley, Tyne and Wear, England, from 1868 to 1955 on the East Coast Main Line.

== History ==
The station opened on 1 December 1868 by the North Eastern Railway. It closed on 5 December 1955 to both passengers and freight traffic.

Preceding station	Historical railways	Following station
Chester-le-Street; Line and station open	North Eastern Railway; East Coast Main Line	Lamesley; Line open, station closed
Pelton; Line and station closed	North Eastern Railway; Stanhope and Tyne Railway	Lamesley; Line open, station closed
