= Eighton Banks =

Village in NE England

Coordinates: 54.917°N 1.566°W

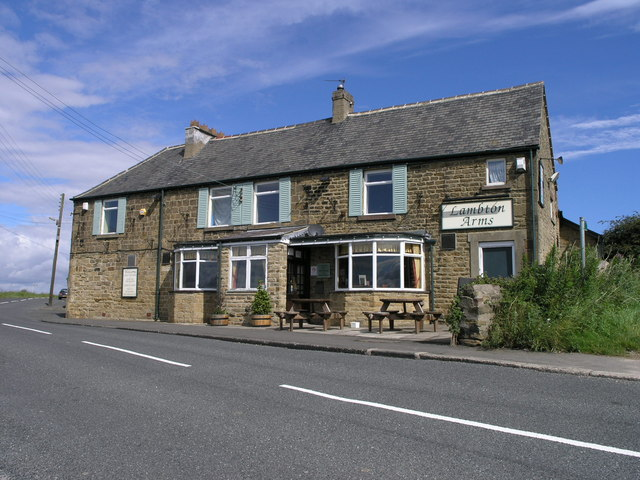
- The Lambton Arms

- Location within Tyne and Wear
- Population: 8,862 (2011 Census data for Lamesley ward)
- OS grid reference: NZ27235831
- Metropolitan borough: Gateshead
- Metropolitan county: Tyne and Wear
- Region: North East
- Country: England
- Sovereign state: United Kingdom
- Post town: GATESHEAD
- Postcode district: NE9
- Dialling code: 0191
- Police: Northumbria
- Fire: Tyne and Wear
- Ambulance: North East
- UK Parliament: Washington and Gateshead South

Eighton Banks is a small village in the Metropolitan Borough of Gateshead, which is located around 4.5 miles (7 km) from Newcastle upon Tyne. The village is bordered by Birtley, Harlow Green and Wrekenton, and is located near to Antony Gormley's Angel of the North sculpture at Low Eighton.

== Demography ==
The data below shows that 51.9% of the population in the Lamesley electoral ward are female, and 48.1% are male. This compares similarly with both the average in the Metropolitan Borough of Gateshead, as well as the national average. A total of 1.9% of the population were from a black, Asian and minority ethnic (BAME) group. This figure is significantly lower than that of the national average (14.6%), as well as being somewhat lower than the borough average (3.7%).

Data from the Office for National Statistics found that the average life expectancy in the Lamesley electoral ward is 77.9 years for men, and 79.6 years for women. Average life expectancy in the North East of England is 77.4 years for men, and 81.4 years for women. Car ownership is lower than the national average (74.2%), but is slightly higher than the average in the borough (63.5%), with 65.3% of households in the ward having access to at least one car.

Demography (data from 2011 Census)
Demographic	% of population Lamesley (Ward)	% of population Gateshead	% of population England
Total	8,862	200,214	53,012,456
Male	48.1%	48.9%	49.2%
Female	51.9%	51.1%	50.8%
BAME	1.9%	3.7%	14.6%
Age 65+	19.9%	17.6%	16.4%

== Education ==
Primary education is provided at nearby Fell Dyke Community Primary School and St. Oswald's Catholic Primary School in Wrekenton, as well as Springwell Village Primary School. For secondary education, students attend the nearby Cardinal Hume Catholic School in Wrekenton, as well as Lord Lawson of Beamish Academy in Birtley, Grace College in Low Fell, and St. Robert of Newminster Catholic School in Washington.

== Governance ==
Lamesley is a local council ward in the Metropolitan Borough of Gateshead. This ward covers an area of around 10.1 square miles (26 km^{2}), and has a population of 8,862. As of September 2020, the ward is served by three councillors: Mary Foy, Michael Hood and Sheila Gallagher.

Eighton Banks is located within the parliamentary constituency of Gateshead, and is served by Labour Member of Parliament (MP), Ian Mearns.

Gateshead Council Local Elections 2019: Lamesley
Candidate	Political party	Total votes	% of votes
Sheila Gallagher	Labour	1,019	52.8%
Sheila Everatt	Conservative	407	21.1%
Betty Gallon	Liberal Party	308	16.0%
Christine McHatton	Liberal Democrats	197	10.2%

== Transport ==
=== Air ===
The nearest airport is Newcastle International Airport, which is located around 12 miles (19 km) from the village. Teesside International Airport and Carlisle Lake District Airport are located around 33 and 59 miles (53 and 95 km) away by road respectively.

=== Bus ===
Eighton Banks is served by three buses per hour to Chester-le-Street, Gateshead and Newcastle upon Tyne.

=== Rail ===
The village is located around 4.5 miles (7 km) from the National Rail station at Newcastle, which is located on the East Coast Main Line.

=== Road ===
Eighton Banks is located near to the A1 and A1231 roads. By road, Gateshead and Newcastle can be reached in around 15 minutes, and Newcastle International Airport in 25 minutes.

== Notable people ==
- Norman Hunter (1943–2020), Leeds United and England footballer, was born and grew up in the village.
