= The Post and Courier =

Newspaper in Charleston, SC

- The July 15, 2015 front page of The Post and Courier
- Type: Daily newspaper
- Format: Broadsheet
- Owner: Evening Post Industries
- Founded: Charleston Courier 1803; Charleston Daily News-1865; News & Courier 1873; The Evening Post 1894; The Post and Courier 1991
- Headquarters: 148 Williman Street; Charleston, SC 29403; United States
- Circulation: 83,483 Daily; 90,168 Sunday (as of March 2013)
- ISSN: 2692-2592
- OCLC number: 52298458
- Website: postandcourier.com

The Post and Courier is an American newspaper in Charleston, South Carolina. It traces its ancestry to three newspapers: the Charleston Courier, founded in 1803; the Charleston Daily News, founded 1865; and The Evening Post, founded 1894. Through the Courier, it brands itself as the oldest daily newspaper in the South and one of the oldest continuously operating newspapers in the United States. It is the flagship newspaper of Evening Post Industries, which is owned by the Manigault family of Charleston, descendants of Peter Manigault.

It is the largest newspaper in South Carolina, followed by Columbia's The State and The Greenville News. It has newsrooms in Greenville, Columbia, Spartanburg, Myrtle Beach, Hilton Head Island, and elsewhere in the state.

== History ==
The Charleston Courier was founded in 1803. The founder of the Courier, Aaron Smith Willington, came from Massachusetts with newspaper experience. In the early 19th century, he was known to row out to meet ships from London, Liverpool, Havre, and New York City to get the news earlier than other Charleston papers. He also had a translator working for him, so he could copy items from the Havana newspapers. Rudolph Septimus Siegling also served as editor during the 1800s. The Charleston Daily News, founded in 1865, merged with it to form the News and Courier in 1873.

The Evening Post was founded in 1894, but quickly ran into financial trouble. In 1896, rice planter Arthur Manigault stepped in to rescue the paper. The paper and its successors have been in the hands of the Manigault family for four generations. In 1926, Manigault's son, Robert, bought The News and Courier.

During the Civil Rights era, the News and Courier was virulently segregationist, to the extent that Time described it as the most segregationist newspaper in the South. Its editor, Thomas R. Waring Jr., was a staunch segregationist, as was staffer W. D. Workman Jr., who ran for public office in a campaign that united South Carolina's divided racial and economic conservatives.

=== Merger ===
By 1991, it was apparent Charleston could no longer support two newspapers; the News and Courier and Evening Post had shared their editorial staff since the 1980s. They were merged into a single morning newspaper, The Post and Courier.

The paper acquired several sisters in the 1990s when its parent bought other newspapers and television stations.

In 2008 and 2009, newspaper officials reacted to declines in revenue with cost-cutting efforts. In 2008, they offered a buyout to employees, a bid to streamline the company and reduce expenses. 64 full-time employees left, shrinking the workforce to 381 by the start of 2009. This was deemed insufficient, so on February 6, 2009, the company laid off 25 employees and on March 23, Evening Post Publishing Co., the parent company of the paper, announced a company-wide furlough that would force all employees to take five days' unpaid leave in the second quarter of 2009. The newspaper said the move was necessary to reduce expenses "because of the continued weakness of the economy and the impact on advertising".

In July 2021, the Post and Courier began moving its offices to 148 Williman Street.

In February 2025, the paper eliminated its Monday and Tuesday print days.

== Awards ==
The newspaper has won a number of awards. In 2015, the newspaper won the Pulitzer Prize for Public Service for coverage of domestic violence. In 2019, Tony Bartelme won the inaugural Victor K. McElheny Knight Science Journalism Award for a story about climate change and the Gulf Stream.In 2016, a team of reporters won a Scripps Howard Foundation Award for an investigation into police shootings. In 2018, the newspaper won the American Society of News Editors Deborah Howell Award for a story about the demise of the Piggly Wiggly Carolina grocery chain. In 2017, the American Geophysical Union awarded Tony Bartelme its Walter Sullivan Award for Excellence in Science Journalism for "Every Other Breath," a series about climate change. In 2008, the newspaper won national awards from the Society of Professional Journalists and American Society of Newspaper Editors for coverage of the Charleston Sofa Super Store fire. In 2008, Reporter Tony Bartelme also won the Gerald Loeb Award for a story about the effect of China's growth on local economies.

The newspaper works to expose corruption and shrink local news deserts with its Uncovered project, a partnership with more than 18 South Carolina newspapers. The project won the South Carolina Press Association's top award for Public Service in 2021.Led by senior reporter Tony Bartelme, the newspaper used the Uncovered model in 2026 to produce Townfall, which identified South Carolina's "accountability deserts" where municipalities have lost newspapers and failed to do state-required independent audits.

== Circulation figures ==
The reported numbers for The Post and Courier's circulation as of the six months ended September 30, 2009, were 86,084 daily and 94,940 on Sundays. This is down some 13% from the period ended March 31, 2008, which were 99,459 daily and 110,289 on Sunday.

At the start of 2009, The Post and Courier's circulation figures were down to 94,647 for dailies and 97,549 for Sundays, 4.8% down from the previous year's figures. By the end of 2012, the circulation figures (including paid and non-paid) had declined to 82,266 for dailies and 92,062 for Sundays.

For the 4th quarter of 2015, paid circulation had dropped to 68,400 for Sundays and 56,000-57,000 for dailies as reported by the Alliance for Audited Media. In the first quarter of 2020, audited daily and Sunday circulation totals were at 45,016 and 51,190, respectively.

== Charleston Scene ==
The newspaper includes Charleston Scene, a Thursday section with entertainment, music and food reviews for the local area. Founded as Preview, it received its current name with the issue of March 11, 2010.

== See also ==
- Anthony Hart Harrigan, former editor
- List of newspapers in South Carolina
