= Lamesley railway station =

Disused railway station in Lamesley, Tyne and Wear

Lamesley
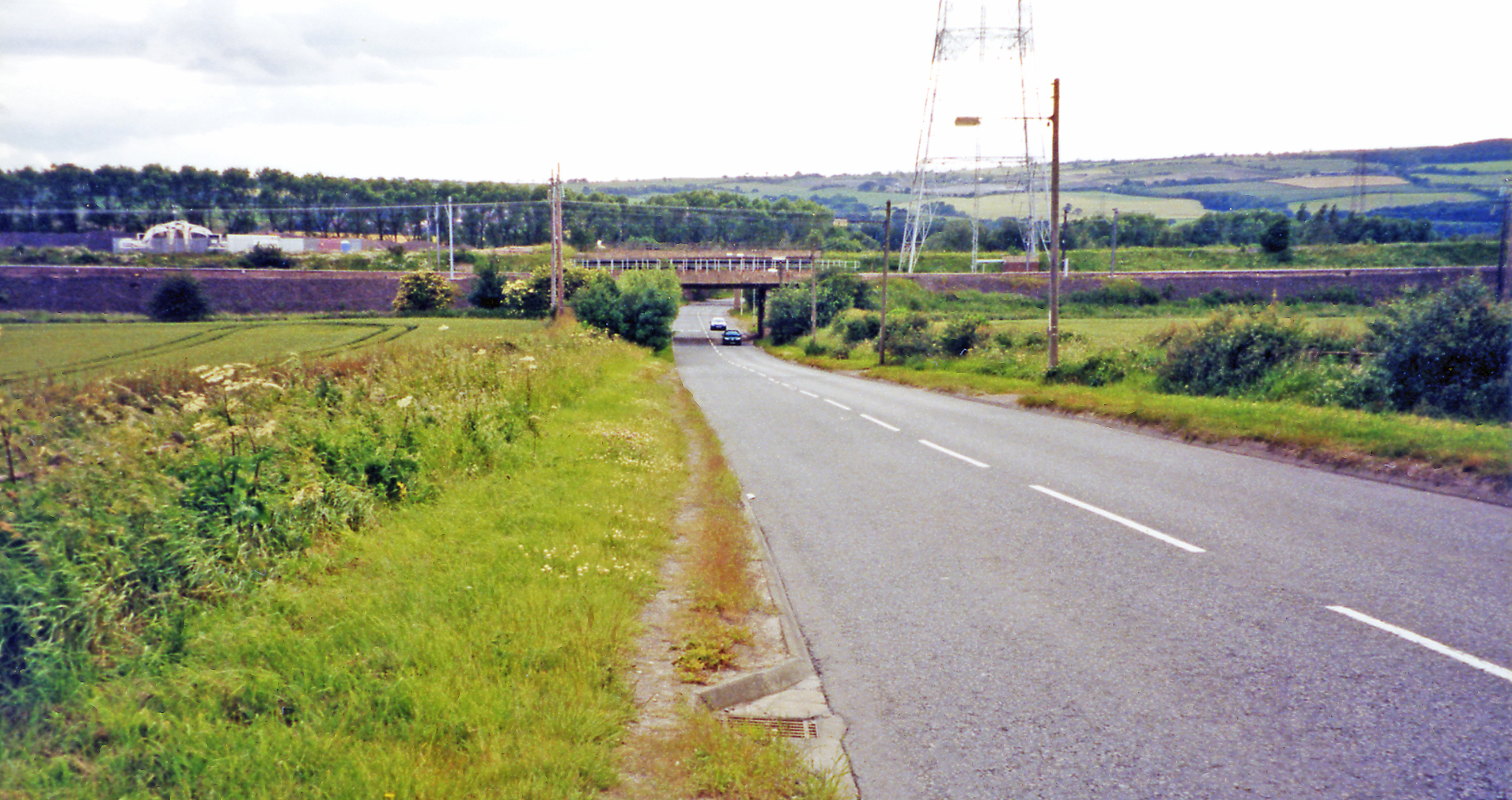
- The site of the station, looking west from Smithy Lane, in 2002

General information
- Location: Lamesley, Tyne and Wear; England
- Coordinates: 54.9161°N 1.6026°W
- Grid reference: NZ256580
- Platforms: 4

Other information
- Status: Disused

History
- Original company: North Eastern Railway
- Post-grouping: LNER

Key dates
- 1 December 1868: Opened
- 4 June 1945: Closed to passengers
- 14 September 1959: Closed to goods traffic
Location

Lamesley railway station served the village of Lamesley, Tyne and Wear, England from 1868 to 1959 on the East Coast Main Line.

== History ==
The station opened on 1 December 1868 by the North Eastern Railway. It closed to passengers on 4 June 1945 and closed completely on 14 September 1959.

Preceding station	Historical railways	Following station
Birtley; Line open, station closed	North Eastern Railway; East Coast Main Line	Low Fell; Line open, station closed
