= Aaron Smith Willington =

American journalist

Aaron Smith Willington (1781–1862) was an American journalist.

Willington served as editor of the Charleston Courier, and under his leadership it was described as "one of the leading newspapers of the country". He was noted for scooping the Treaty of Ghent, publishing news of the settlement before his competitors in the northern US.

He wrote A Summer's Tour in Europe, in 1851: In a Series of Letters, Addressed to the Editors of the Charleston Courier, published in 1852.
