= Low Fell railway station =

Former railway station in England

Low Fell
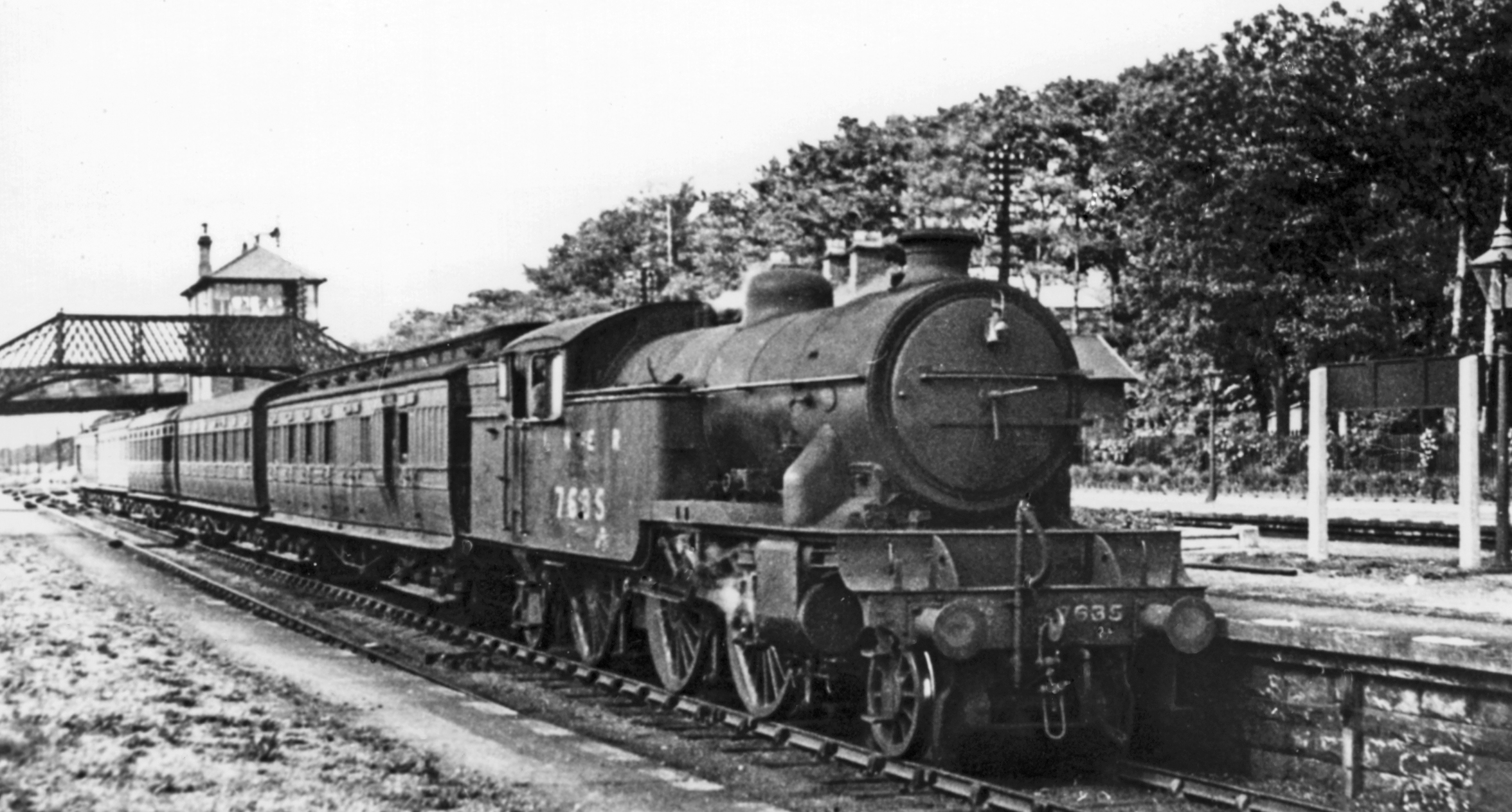
- Newcastle - Blackhill local train at Low Fell, 1946

General information
- Location: Low Fell, Gateshead; England
- Coordinates: 54.9339°N 1.6098°W
- Grid reference: NZ251599
- Platforms: 4

Other information
- Status: Disused

History
- Original company: North Eastern Railway
- Pre-grouping: North Eastern Railway
- Post-grouping: London and North Eastern Railway

Key dates
- 1 December 1868: Station opened
- 7 April 1952: Station closed
Location

Low Fell railway station served the Low Fell area of Gateshead between 1868 and 1952.

== History ==
The station was opened by the North Eastern Railway (NER) on 1 December 1868. It was situated on the NER's Team Valley line, which opened for passenger trains the same day – it had been open since 2 March 1868 for freight traffic only.

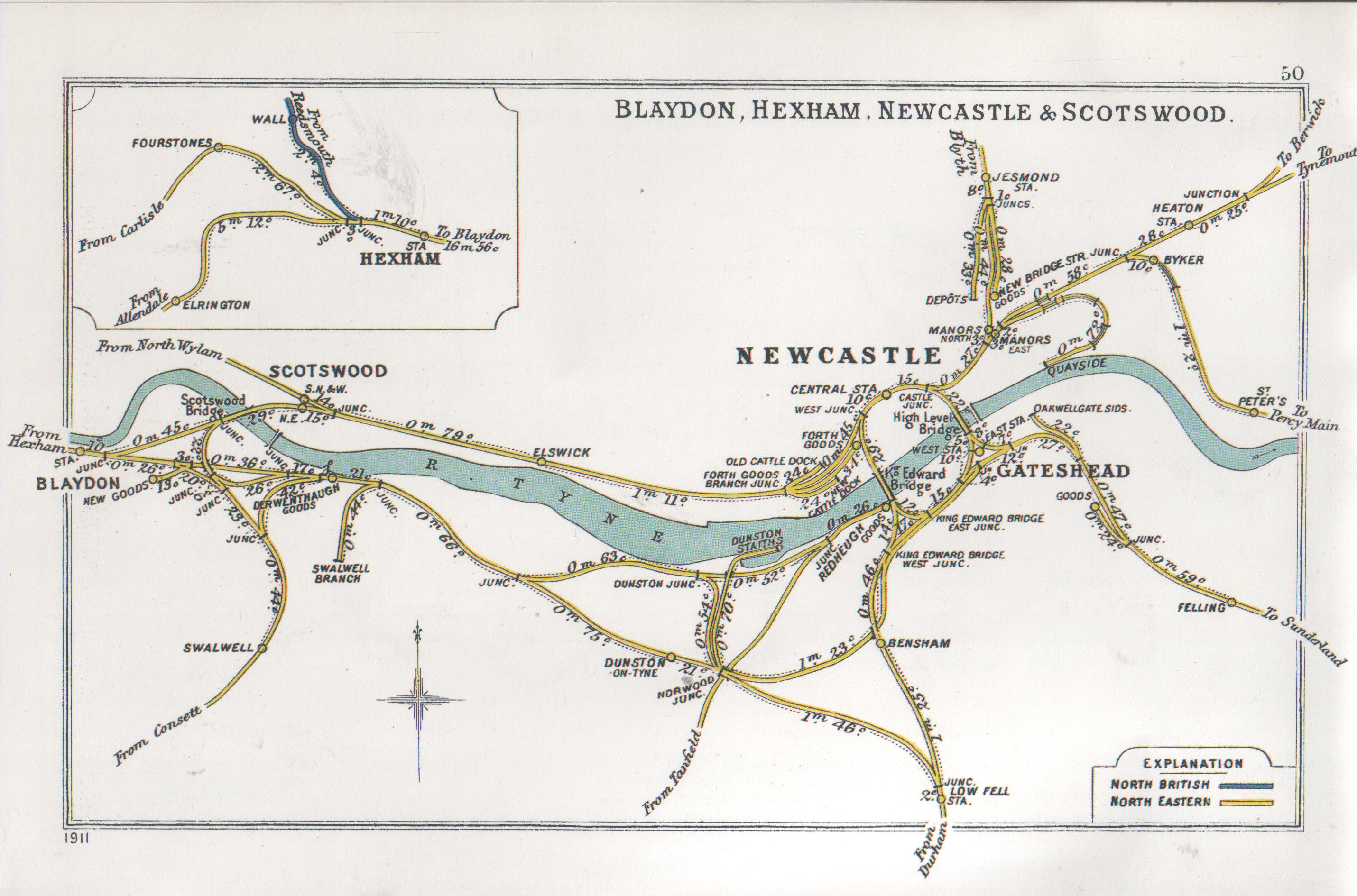
A 1911 Railway Clearing House Junction Diagram showing railways around Newcastle and Gateshead, including Low Fell (bottom right)

The station was closed by British Railways on 7 April 1952, but the line remains open as part of the East Coast Main Line.

Preceding station	Historical railways	Following station
Lamesley; Line open, station closed	North Eastern Railway; Team Valley Line	Bensham; Line open, station closed
