= Willington Techera =

Uruguayan footballer (born 1985)

Personal information
- Full name: Willinton Federico Techera Acosta
- Date of birth: October 12, 1985 (age 41)
- Place of birth: Tacuarembó, Uruguay
- Height: 1.80 m (5 ft 11 in)
- Position: Full-back

Team information
- Current team: Uruguay Montevideo

Senior career*
Years	Team	Apps	(Gls)
2005–2008	Tacuarembó	74	(2)
2009	Olimpia		
2009–2010	Peñarol	9	(0)
2010–2012	Rampla Juniors	31	(2)
2012–2013	Fénix	14	(1)
2014–2015	Torque	33	(13)
2015–2018	Rampla Juniors	56	(1)
2017	→ Deportivo Mictlán (loan)	17	(0)
2018	Malacateco	12	(1)
2019–2020	Siquinalá	27	(3)
2020–	Uruguay Montevideo		
- * Club domestic league appearances and goals as of 13:06, 27 September 2020 (UTC)

Willinton Federico Techera Acosta (born October 12, 1985 in Montevideo), commonly known as Willington Techera, is a Uruguayan footballer who plays as a defender for Uruguay Montevideo.

== Honours ==
Olimpia

- Liga Nacional: 2008-09 Clausura

Peñarol

- Primera División Uruguaya: 2009–10
