= Birtley, Tyne and Wear =

Town in North-East England

Coordinates: 54.900°N 1.577°W

Birtley
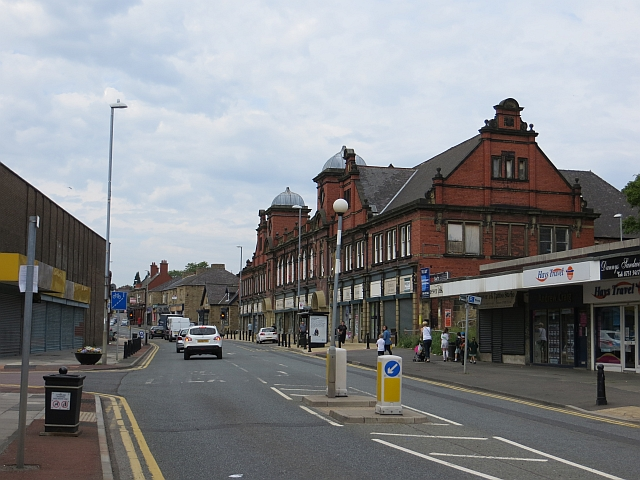
- Durham Road, Birtley

- Location within Tyne and Wear
- Population: 8,367 (2011.Ward)
- OS grid reference: NZ271563
- Metropolitan borough: Gateshead
- Metropolitan county: Tyne and Wear
- Region: North East
- Country: England
- Sovereign state: United Kingdom
- Post town: Chester Le Street
- Postcode district: DH2, DH3
- Dialling code: 0191
- Police: Northumbria
- Fire: Tyne and Wear
- Ambulance: North East
- UK Parliament: Washington and Gateshead South

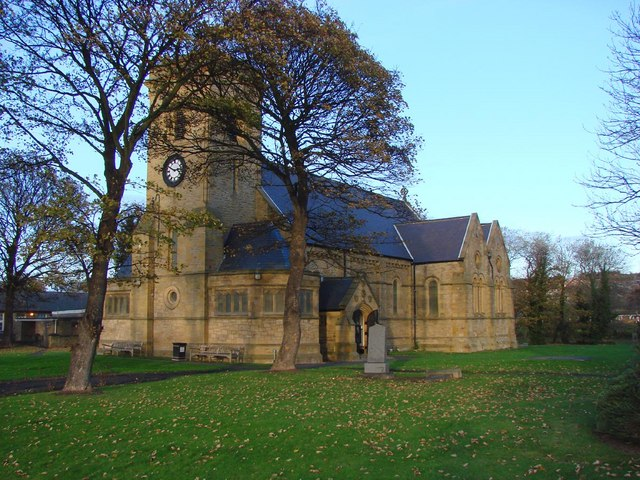
St John the Evangelist church, Birtley

Birtley is a town in the Metropolitan Borough of Gateshead, in Tyne and Wear, England. It is situated to the south of Gateshead and is conjoined to Chester-le-Street across the county boundary in County Durham.

== History ==
Birtley was historically a township and chapelry in the ancient parish of Chester-le-Street, in 1866, the legal definition of 'parish' was changed to be the areas used for administering the poor laws, and so Birtley became a civil parish.

In 1894 Birtley and the adjoining areas of Barley Mow, Vigo and Portobello became part of Chester-le-Street Rural District under County Durham until being moved into Tyne and Wear under the Borough of Gateshead in 1974. It forms an urban area with nearby Chester-le-Street, Washington, Houghton le Spring, Hetton le Hole and Sunderland as part of Wearside. Birtley was a civil parish with a parish council (which also covered the adjoining neighbourhoods) until 1 April 2006, after a local referendum agreed to abolish it. The former parish had a population of 11,377 in 2001. The ward of Birtley in the Gateshead MBC had a population of 8,367 in the 2011 Census.

On 3 July 2010 Raoul Moat shot two people in Birtley at the start of the 2010 Northumbria Police manhunt. He went on to shoot a police officer before committing suicide. The manhunt lasted almost seven days, and was the largest in modern British history, involving 160 armed officers and armed response vehicles, many seconded for the operation from other police forces.

In September 2024, Prince William visited Birtley as a visit to Birtley Swimming Centre for its reopening.

== Elisabethville ==
Elisabethville was a sovereign Belgian area of Birtley housing Belgian refugees, known as The Birtley Belgians, who worked at the Royal Ordnance Factory during World War I. It was a community of 6000 residents who were accommodated in a mixture of hostels and cottages.

When the war ended and the inhabitants were largely repatriated, it was occupied by people of British and other nationalities, before its demolition and replacement with more permanent housing.

== Angel of the North ==
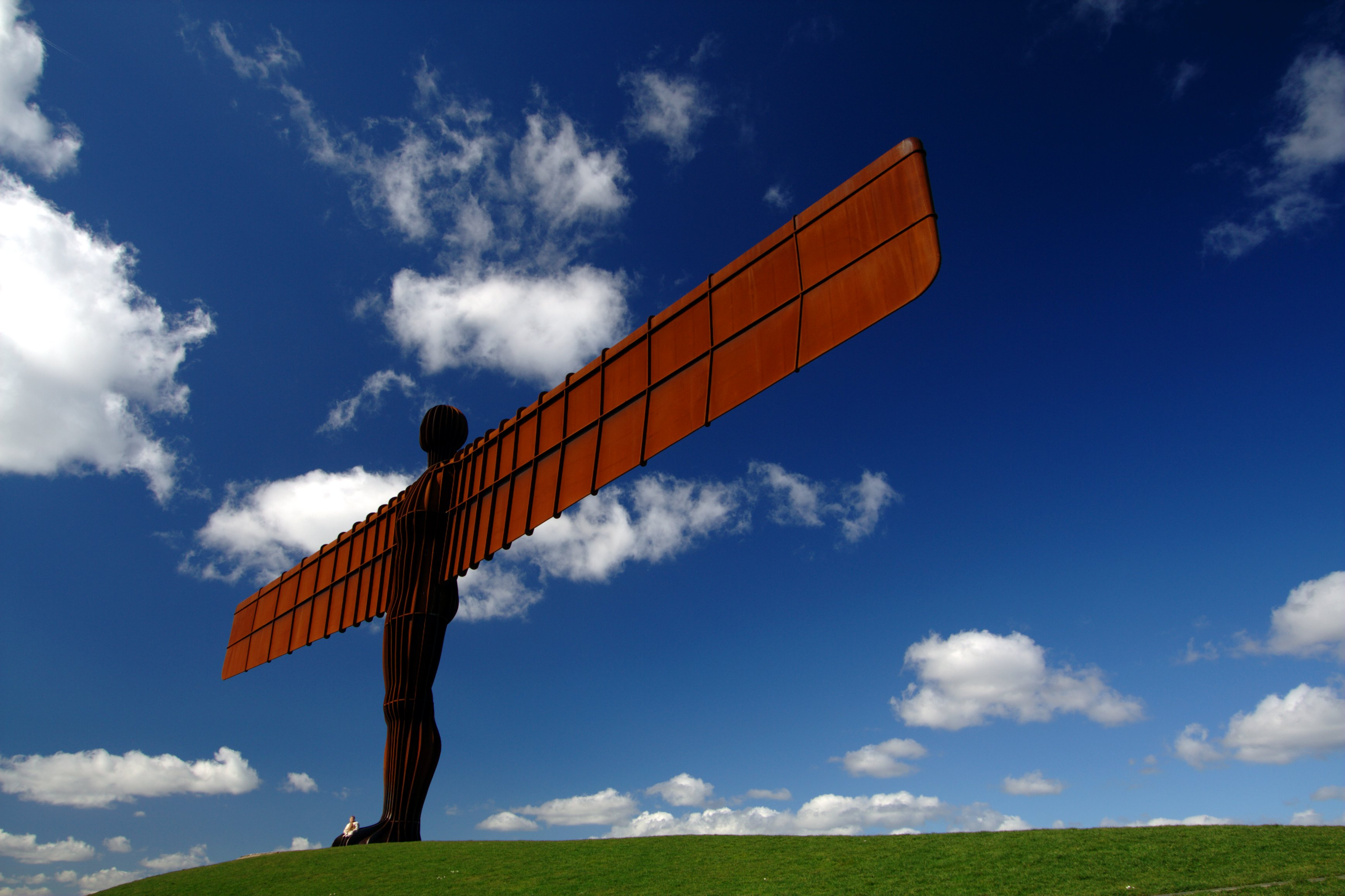
Angel of the North

Antony Gormley's famous Angel of the North sculpture, completed in February 1998, is on high ground at the site of the baths of the old 'Betty Ann Pit' at Eighton Lodge, Gateshead, to the north of Birtley.

== Religion ==
There are altogether three mainstream churches in Birtley, which also has a large cemetery with a chapel and crematorium: Birtley is also home to three Jehovah's Witness congregations.

1. St Joseph's (Roman Catholic) (Built in 1843 after the Roman Catholic Relief Act 1791 and designed by John Dobson in early Gothic style, it is currently served by Fr Martin Wheaton)
2. St John the Evangelist (Church of England)
3. Birtley Methodist Church
4. Kingdom hall of Jehovahs witnesses shared by three congregations. Birtley, Washington and Chester Le Street.

== Transport links ==
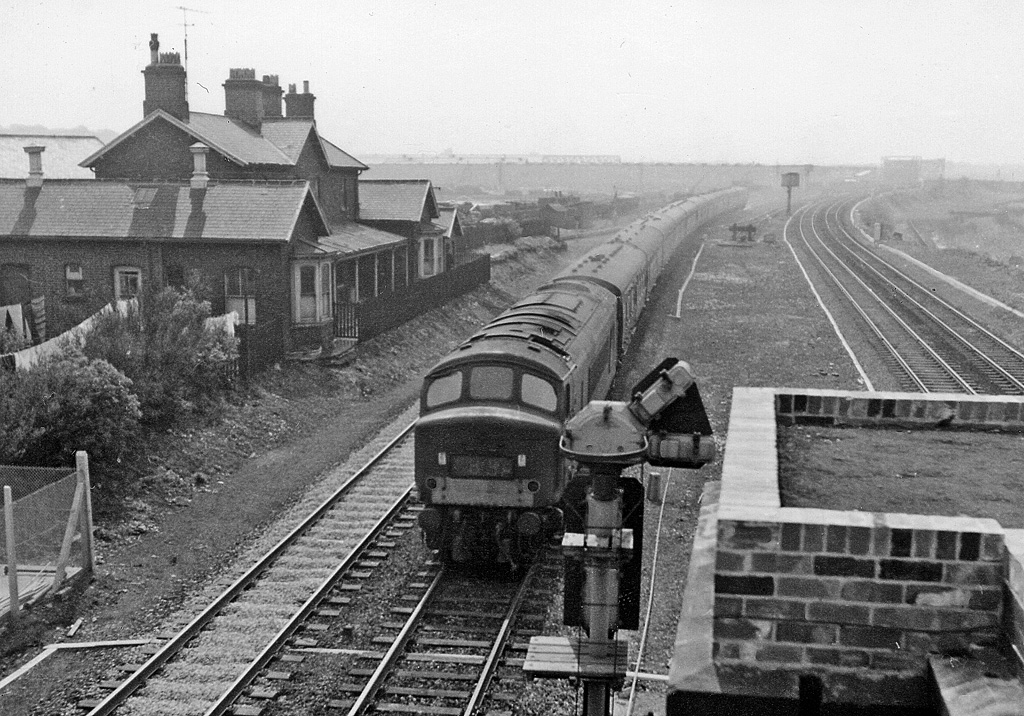
Remains of Birtley Station in 1965

The main road through Birtley is the non-primary A167, which runs from Topcliffe, North Yorkshire through to the north of Newcastle upon Tyne and is the same road which runs across the Tyne Bridge. This was an original route for the Great North Road and the A1 until a bypass was built (which was upgraded to motorway standard in the 1960s).

The main East Coast railway line runs to the west of the town. Mainline trains used to stop at the town's long dismantled station. Birtley railway station was closed on 5 December 1955. The Station Hotel was closed in 1971, having been opened in 1868 or earlier.
