= FA Youth Cup Finals of the 1990s =

List of English football matches

FA Youth Cup Finals from 1990 to 1999.

== 1989–90: Tottenham v. Middlesbrough (2–1 and 1–1, 3–2 aggregate) ==
1st Leg May 7, 1990 Ayresome Park, Middlesbrough Attendance:8,497

2nd Leg May 13, 1990 White Hart Lane, Tottenham Attendance: 5,579

Note: Flags indicate national team as defined under FIFA eligibility rules; some limited exceptions apply. Players may hold more than one non-FIFA nationality.

Tottenham Hotspur
No.	Pos.	Nation	Player
1	GK	ENG	Ian Walker
2	DF	ENG	Ian Hendon
3	DF	LCA	Warren Hackett
4	MF	ENG	Neil Smith
5	DF	ENG	David Tuttle
6	DF	ENG	Victor Hardwicke
7	MF	ENG	Gregory Howell
8	MF	ENG	Kevin Smith
9	FW	ENG	Olisa Morah
10	FW	ENG	Anthony Potts
11	MF	ENG	Scott Houghton
Sub		ENG	Lee Fulling
Sub		ENG	Halton

Middlesbrough
No.	Pos.	Nation	Player
1	GK	IRL	Michael Devine
2	DF	ENG	Nesbitt
3	DF	ENG	Scott Green
4	DF	ENG	Mark Sunley
5	DF	ENG	Lee Crosby
6	MF	ENG	Robert Lake
7	MF	ENG	David Keaveney
8	MF	ENG	Dan Holmes
9	FW	ENG	Ian Arnold
10	FW	ENG	Andy Fletcher
11	MF	ENG	Lee Tucker
Sub		ENG	Paul Melling
Sub		ENG	Lee Roxby
Sub		ENG	Ferguson

== 1990–91: Millwall v. Sheffield Wednesday (3–0 and 0–0, 3–0 aggregate) ==
1st Leg Hillsborough May 1, 1991 Attendance:

2nd Leg The Old Den May 7, 1991 Attendance: 4,261 Note: Flags indicate national team as defined under FIFA eligibility rules; some limited exceptions apply. Players may hold more than one non-FIFA nationality.

Millwall
No.	Pos.	Nation	Player
1	GK	ENG	Carl Emberson
2	DF	ENG	Frank McArthur
3	DF	ENG	Tony Dolby
4	MF	ENG	Andy Roberts
5	DF	ENG	Mark Foran
6	DF	ENG	Brian Lee
7	MF	CHI	Vladimir Pavez
8	FW	IRL	Sean Devine
9	FW	ENG	Lee Walker
10	MF	ENG	Paul Manning
11	MF	ENG	Brett Smith
—	DF	SCO	Gregor Rioch
—	DF	ENG	Roy Bedford

Sheffield Wednesday
No.	Pos.	Nation	Player
1	GK	ENG	Paul Robinson
2	DF	ENG	Brian Linighan
3	DF	ENG	Gareth Dunn
4	MF	ENG	Ronnie Simpson
5	DF	ENG	Simon Stewart
6	DF	ENG	Paul Burton
7	FW	ENG	Michael Rowntree
8	MF	WAL	Ryan Jones
9	FW	ENG	Nicholas Robinson
10	MF	ENG	Leroy Chambers
11	MF	ENG	Richard Curzon
—		ENG	Jonathan Flint
—		ENG	Mark Simmonite

== 1991–92: Manchester United v. Crystal Palace (3–1 and 3–2, 6–3 aggregate) ==
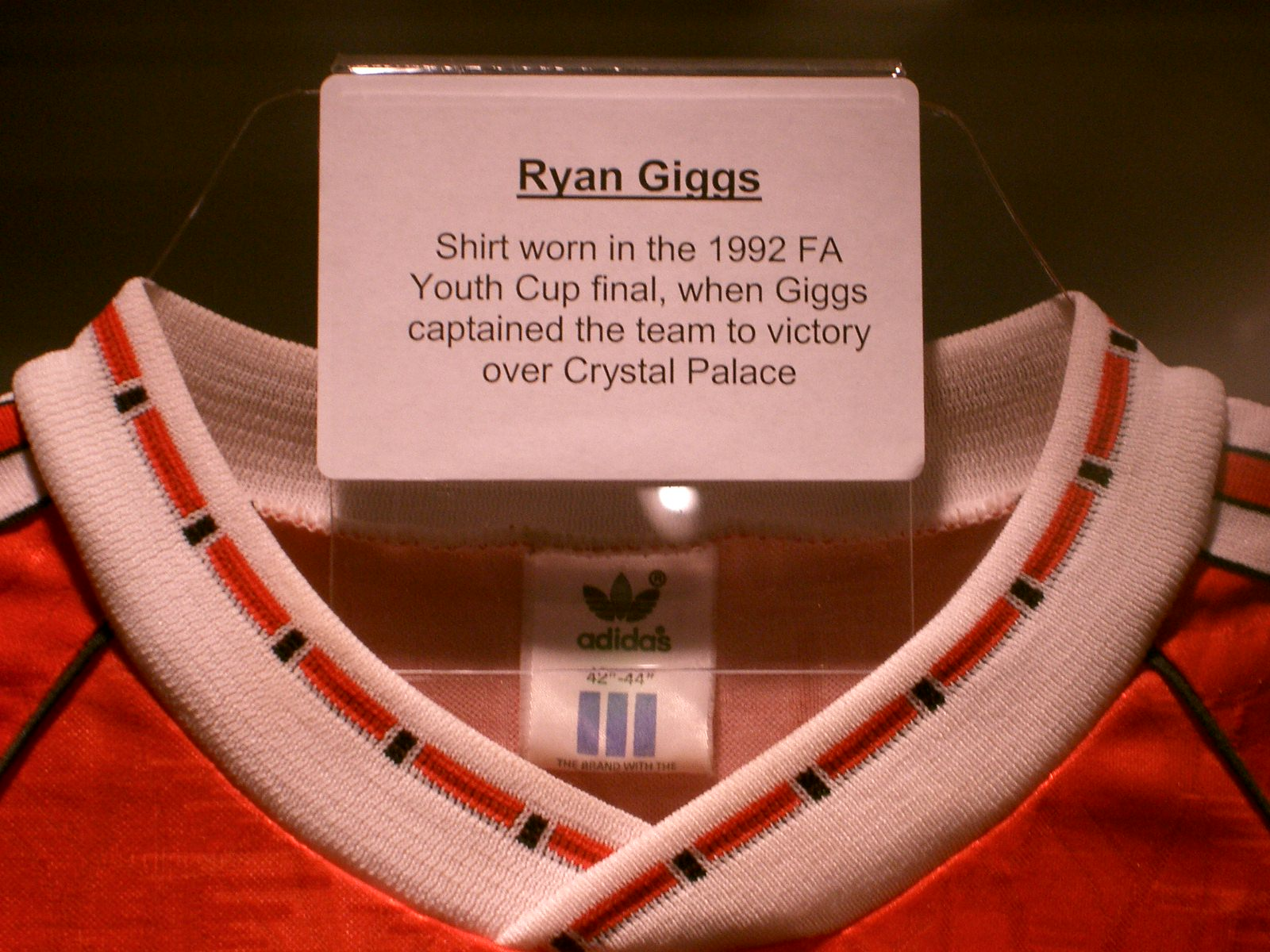
Shirt worn by Ryan Giggs in the final

=== First leg ===
14 April 1992

Crystal Palace	1–3	Manchester United
McCall 86'		Butt 17', 89'; Beckham 30'

Selhurst Park, London
Attendance: 7,825

Note: Flags indicate national team as defined under FIFA eligibility rules; some limited exceptions apply. Players may hold more than one non-FIFA nationality.

Crystal Palace
No.	Pos.	Nation	Player
1	GK	ENG	Jimmy Glass
2	DF	ENG	Tim Clark
3	DF	ENG	Scott Cutler
4	MF	ENG	Mark Holman (c)
5	DF	ENG	Russell Edwards
6	DF	ENG	Andy McPherson (substituted off) 33'
7	MF	SCO	Mark Hawthorne
8	MF	ENG	Simon Rollison
9	FW	CAN	Niall Thompson (substituted off) 76'
10	FW	ENG	Grant Watts
11	MF	ENG	George Ndah
Sub	MF	ENG	Stuart McCall (substituted on) 76'
Sub	DF	ENG	Paul Sparrow (substituted on) 33'
Manager		ENG	Stuart Scott

Manchester United
No.	Pos.	Nation	Player
1	GK	ENG	Kevin Pilkington
2	DF	ENG	John O'Kane
3	DF	ENG	George Switzer
4	DF	ENG	Chris Casper
5	DF	ENG	Gary Neville (c)
6	MF	ENG	David Beckham
7	MF	ENG	Nicky Butt
8	MF	WAL	Simon Davies (substituted off)
9	FW	SCO	Colin McKee
10	FW	WAL	Robbie Savage
11	MF	ENG	Ben Thornley (substituted off)
Manager		ENG	Eric Harrison

=== Second leg ===
15 May 1992

Manchester United	3–2	Crystal Palace
Thornley 33'; Davies 50'; McKee		McPherson 1'; McCall 62'

Old Trafford, Manchester
Attendance: 14,681

Note: Flags indicate national team as defined under FIFA eligibility rules; some limited exceptions apply. Players may hold more than one non-FIFA nationality.

Manchester United
No.	Pos.	Nation	Player
1	GK	ENG	Kevin Pilkington
2	DF	ENG	John O'Kane
3	DF	ENG	George Switzer
4	DF	ENG	Chris Casper
5	DF	ENG	Gary Neville
6	MF	ENG	David Beckham
7	MF	ENG	Nicky Butt
8	MF	WAL	Simon Davies (substituted off)
9	FW	SCO	Colin McKee
10	FW	WAL	Ryan Giggs(c)
11	MF	ENG	Ben Thornley (substituted off)
Sub	FW	WAL	Robbie Savage (substituted on) on for 8'
Sub	MF	NIR	Keith Gillespie (substituted on) on for 11'
Manager		ENG	Eric Harrison

Crystal Palace
No.	Pos.	Nation	Player
1	GK	ENG	Jimmy Glass
2	DF	ENG	Paul Sparrow
3	DF	ENG	Scott Cutler
4	MF	ENG	Mark Holman (c)
5	DF	ENG	Russell Edwards (substituted off)
6	DF	ENG	Andy McPherson
7	MF	SCO	Mark Hawthorne
8	MF	ENG	Simon Rollison (substituted off)
9	FW	ENG	Stuart McCall
10	MF	ENG	George Ndah
11	FW	ENG	Tim Clark
Sub	MF	ENG	Grant Watts (substituted on) on for 5'
Sub	DF	ENG	Sean Daly (substituted on) on for 8'
Manager		ENG	Stuart Scott

== 1992–93: Leeds United v. Manchester United (2–0 and 2–1, 4–1 aggregate) ==
=== First leg ===
10 May 1993

Manchester United	0–2	Leeds United
		Forrester 16'; Whelan 62'

Old Trafford, Manchester
Attendance: 30,562

Note: Flags indicate national team as defined under FIFA eligibility rules; some limited exceptions apply. Players may hold more than one non-FIFA nationality.

Manchester United
No.	Pos.	Nation	Player
1	GK	IRL	Darren Whitmarsh
2	DF	ENG	John O'Kane
3	DF	ENG	Steven Riley
4	DF	ENG	Chris Casper
5	DF	ENG	Gary Neville (c)
6	MF	NIR	Keith Gillespie
7	MF	ENG	Nicky Butt
8	MF	ENG	David Beckham (substituted off)
9	FW	ENG	Richard Irving (substituted off)
10	FW	ENG	Paul Scholes
11	MF	ENG	Ben Thornley
Sub	DF	NIR	Colin Murdock (substituted on) on for 9'
Sub	FW	WAL	Robbie Savage (substituted on) on for 8'
Manager		ENG	Eric Harrison

Leeds United
No.	Pos.	Nation	Player
1	GK	ENG	Paul Pettinger
2	DF	ENG	Andy Couzens
3	DF	ENG	Kevin Sharp
4	MF	ENG	Mark Tinkler
5	DF	ENG	Kevin Daly
6	DF	ENG	Rob Bowman
7	MF	ENG	Matthew Smithard
8	MF	ENG	Mark Ford (c)
9	FW	ENG	Noel Whelan
10	MF	ENG	Simon Oliver
11	FW	ENG	Jamie Forrester
Sub	MF	ENG	Alex Byrne (not used)
Sub	FW	ENG	Steve Tobin (not used)
Sub	FW	ENG	Darren Kerry (not used)
Manager		ENG	Paul Hart

=== Second leg ===
13 May 1993

Leeds United	2–1	Manchester United
Forrester 12'; Smithard 30'		Scholes 29' (pen.)

Elland Road, Leeds
Attendance: 31,037

Note: Flags indicate national team as defined under FIFA eligibility rules; some limited exceptions apply. Players may hold more than one non-FIFA nationality.

Leeds United
No.	Pos.	Nation	Player
1	GK	ENG	Paul Pettinger
2	DF	ENG	Andy Couzens
3	DF	ENG	Kevin Sharp
4	MF	ENG	Mark Tinkler
5	DF	ENG	Kevin Daly
6	DF	ENG	Rob Bowman (substituted off)
7	MF	ENG	Matthew Smithard
8	MF	ENG	Mark Ford (c)
9	FW	ENG	Noel Whelan (substituted off)
10	MF	ENG	Simon Oliver (substituted off)
11	FW	ENG	Jamie Forrester
Sub	MF	ENG	Alex Byrne (substituted on) on for 10'
Sub	FW	ENG	Steve Tobin (substituted on) on for 6'
Sub	FW	ENG	Darren Kerry (substituted on) on for 9'
Manager		ENG	Paul Hart

Manchester United
No.	Pos.	Nation	Player
1	GK	IRL	Darren Whitmarsh
2	DF	ENG	Phil Neville
3	DF	ENG	Steven Riley
4	DF	ENG	Chris Casper
5	DF	ENG	Gary Neville (c)
6	MF	NIR	Keith Gillespie
7	MF	ENG	Paul Scholes
8	MF	ENG	David Beckham
9	FW	ENG	Richard Irving (substituted off)
10	MF	WAL	Robbie Savage
11	FW	ENG	Ben Thornley
Sub	DF	NIR	Colin Murdock (substituted on) on for 9'
Sub	MF	ENG	Mark Rawlinson (not used)
Manager		ENG	Eric Harrison

== 1993–94: Arsenal v. Millwall (2–3 and 3–0, 5–3 aggregate) ==
1st Leg May 6, 1994 The New Den, Bermondsey Millwall 3, Arsenal 2 Attendance: 6,098

2nd Leg May 12, 1994 Highbury Stadium, Highbury Arsenal 3, Millwall 0 Attendance:

Note: Flags indicate national team as defined under FIFA eligibility rules; some limited exceptions apply. Players may hold more than one non-FIFA nationality.

Arsenal
No.	Pos.	Nation	Player
1	GK	ENG	Noel Imber
2	DF	ENG	Timmy Griggs
3	DF	ENG	Ross Taylor
4	MF	ENG	Jamie Howell
5	DF	ENG	Graeme Hall
6	DF	SCO	Chris McDonald
7	MF	ENG	Michael Black
8	MF	ENG	Matthew Rose (c)
9	FW	ENG	Matthew Rawlins
10	MF	ENG	Gavin McGowan
11	MF	ENG	Stephen Hughes
Sub	FW	ENG	Albert Clarke
Sub	FW	ENG	Robbie Drake

Millwall
No.	Pos.	Nation	Player
1	GK	IRL	Adrian Cronin
2	DF	ENG	Paul Irving
3	DF	ENG	Colin Luckett
4	MF	IRL	Mark Mulraney
5	DF	WAL	Ben Thatcher
6	DF	ENG	Dean Francis
7	MF	ENG	Geoff Pitcher
8	FW	ENG	Neville Gordon
9	FW	IRL	Mark Kennedy
10	MF	ENG	Richard Williams
11	MF	ENG	Jermaine Wright
Sub		ENG	Phil O'Neil

== 1994–95: Manchester United v. Tottenham Hotspur (1–2 and 1–0, 2–2 aggregate, 4–3 penalty shootout) ==
=== First leg ===
11 May 1995
20:00 BST

Tottenham Hotspur	2–1	Manchester United
Wormull 7'; Allen 47'		Cooke 85'

White Hart Lane, London
Attendance: 3,503

Note: Flags indicate national team as defined under FIFA eligibility rules; some limited exceptions apply. Players may hold more than one non-FIFA nationality.

Tottenham Hotspur
No.	Pos.	Nation	Player
1	GK	ENG	Simon Brown
2	DF	IRL	Stephen Carr
3	DF	IRL	Ross Darcy
4	DF	IRL	Kevin Maher (c)
5	DF	ENG	Simon Wormull
6	FW	ENG	Simon Spencer
7	MF	ENG	Stephen Clemence
8	MF	RSA	Mark Arber
9	MF	IRL	Peter Gain
10	FW	IRL	Neale Fenn
11	FW	ENG	Rory Allen (substituted off) 73'
Sub	DF	ENG	Mark Janney
Sub	GK	ENG	Aaron Shave
Sub	FW	ENG	James Bunn (substituted on) 73'
Manager		SCO	Des Bulpin

Manchester United
No.	Pos.	Nation	Player
1	GK	ENG	Paul Gibson
2	DF	ENG	Phil Neville (c)
3	DF	ENG	Ronnie Wallwork
4	DF	ENG	Ashley Westwood
5	DF	ENG	Michael Clegg
6	MF	ENG	Daniel Hall
7	MF	ENG	Neil Mustoe
8	FW	JAM	David Johnson
9	FW	IRL	Dessie Baker (substituted off) 69'
10	MF	ENG	Terry Cooke
11	MF	NIR	Phil Mulryne (substituted off) 75'
Sub	DF	ENG	John Curtis (substituted on) 69'
Sub	GK	ENG	Heath Maxon
Sub	FW	ENG	David Gardner (substituted on) 75'
Manager		ENG	Eric Harrison

=== Second leg ===
15 May 1995
19:30

Manchester United	1–0 (a.e.t.)	Tottenham Hotspur
Cooke 89'
Penalties
Neville (penalty missed); Mustoe (penalty scored); Wallwork (penalty scored); Baker (penalty scored); Cooke (penalty scored)	4–3	Fenn (penalty scored); Spencer (penalty missed); Brady (penalty scored); Carr (penalty missed); Maher (penalty scored)

Old Trafford, Manchester
Attendance: 20,190

Note: Flags indicate national team as defined under FIFA eligibility rules; some limited exceptions apply. Players may hold more than one non-FIFA nationality.

Manchester United
No.	Pos.	Nation	Player
1	GK	ENG	Paul Gibson
2	DF	ENG	Phil Neville (c)
3	DF	ENG	Ronnie Wallwork
4	DF	ENG	Ashley Westwood
5	DF	ENG	Michael Clegg
6	MF	ENG	Daniel Hall (substituted off) 67'
7	MF	ENG	Neil Mustoe
8	FW	JAM	David Johnson
9	FW	IRL	Dessie Baker
10	MF	ENG	Terry Cooke
11	MF	NIR	Phil Mulryne (substituted off) 72'
Sub	DF	ENG	David Hilton (substituted on) 72'
Sub	GK	ENG	Heath Maxon
Sub	FW	ENG	David Gardner (substituted on) 67'
Manager		ENG	Eric Harrison

Tottenham Hotspur
No.	Pos.	Nation	Player
1	GK	ENG	Simon Brown
2	DF	IRL	Stephen Carr
3	DF	IRL	Ross Darcy
4	DF	IRL	Kevin Maher (c)
5	DF	ENG	Simon Wormull (substituted off) 60'
6	FW	ENG	Simon Spencer
7	MF	SCO	Garry Brady
8	MF	ENG	Mark Arber
9	MF	IRL	Peter Gain
10	FW	IRL	Neale Fenn
11	FW	ENG	Rory Allen (substituted off) 74'
Sub	DF	ENG	Stephen Clemence (substituted on) 60'
Sub	GK	ENG	Aaron Shave
Sub	FW	ENG	Sammy Winston (substituted on) 74'
Manager		SCO	Des Bulpin

== 1995–96: Liverpool v. West Ham United (2–0 and 2–1, 4–1 aggregate) ==
=== First Leg ===
30 April 1996

West Ham Utd	0–2	Liverpool
		Newby 23'; Larmour 74'

Upton Park,, Upton Park
Attendance: 15,386

Note: Flags indicate national team as defined under FIFA eligibility rules; some limited exceptions apply. Players may hold more than one non-FIFA nationality.

Liverpool
No.	Pos.	Nation	Player
1	GK	ENG	Roy Naylor
2	DF	ENG	Lee Prior
3	DF	ENG	Phil Brazier
4	DF	ENG	Jamie Carragher
5	DF	WAL	Gareth Roberts
6	MF	ENG	Stuart Quinn
7	MF	ENG	David Thompson
8	MF	ENG	Mark Quinn
9	MF	ENG	Jamie Cassidy
10	FW	ENG	Jon Newby
11	FW	ENG	Andy Parkinson
Sub	GK	ENG	Ian Dunbavin
Sub	DF	ENG	Eddie Turkington
Sub	DF	ENG	Paul Proctor
Sub	FW		D Mane
Sub	FW	ENG	Michael Owen

West Ham Utd
No.	Pos.	Nation	Player
1	GK	ENG	Neil Finn
2	DF	AUS	Chris Coyne
3	DF	ENG	Rio Ferdinand
4	DF	WAL	David Partridge
5	DF	ENG	Jason Moore
6	MF	NGA	Emmanuel Omoyinmi
7	MF	ENG	Frank Lampard
8	MF	ENG	Anthony McFarlane
9	MF	ENG	Joe Keith
10	FW	ENG	Lee Boylan
11	MF	ENG	Lee Hodges
Sub	GK	IRL	Alex O'Reilly
Sub	DF	ENG	Justin Bowen
Sub	MF	ENG	Lee Goodwin
Sub	MF	ENG	Chris Sains

=== Second Leg ===
17 May 1996

Liverpool	2–1	West Ham Utd
Owen 40'; Quinn 55'		Lampard 1'

Anfield, Liverpool
Attendance: 20,600

== 1996–97: Leeds United v. Crystal Palace (2–1 and 1–0, 3–1 aggregate) ==
=== First Leg ===
24 April 1997

Leeds United	2–1	Crystal Palace
Boyle 4'; Jones 21'	Report	Harris 66'

Elland Road, Beeston
Attendance: 6,649

Note: Flags indicate national team as defined under FIFA eligibility rules; some limited exceptions apply. Players may hold more than one non-FIFA nationality.

Leeds United
No.	Pos.	Nation	Player
1	GK	ENG	Paul Robinson
2	DF	IRL	Alan Maybury
3	DF	ENG	Jonathan Woodgate
4	DF	IRL	Damian Lynch
5	MF	AUS	Harry Kewell
6	DF	ENG	Kevin Dixon
7	MF	NOR	Tommy Knarvik
8	MF	IRL	Stephen McPhail
9	MF	NIR	Wesley Boyle
10	MF	WAL	Matthew Jones
11	FW	ENG	Lee Matthews
Sub	MF	ENG	Stuart Gore
Sub	FW	ENG	Alan Smith

Crystal Palace
No.	Pos.	Nation	Player
1	GK	RSA	Gareth Ormshaw
2	DF	ENG	James Hibbert
3	DF	ENG	Hayden Mullins
4	DF	ENG	David Woozley
5	DF	IRL	Tony Folan
6	MF	NIR	Wayne Carlisle
7	MF	IRL	Richard Kennedy
8	MF	ENG	David Stevens
9	FW	WAL	Andrew Martin
10	FW	IRL	Clinton Morrison
11	MF	NIR	Gareth Graham
Sub	MF	ENG	Richard Harris
Sub	FW	ENG	Paul Sears

=== Second Leg ===
15 May 1997

Crystal Palace	0–1	Leeds United
	Report	Matthews 82'

Selhurst Park, Selhurst
Attendance: 4,759

== 1997–98: Everton v. Blackburn (3–1 and 2–2, 5–3 aggregate) ==
=== First leg ===
1 May 1998

Blackburn Rovers	1–3	Everton
Taylor 21'	Report	Jevons 10'; Cadamarteri 44'; Osman 84'

Ewood Park, Blackburn
Attendance: 9,280
Referee: Neale Barry

Note: Flags indicate national team as defined under FIFA eligibility rules; some limited exceptions apply. Players may hold more than one non-FIFA nationality.

Blackburn Rovers
No.	Pos.	Nation	Player
1	GK	ENG	Gareth Stewart
2	DF	ENG	Leam Richardson
3	DF	IRL	Peter Murphy
4	MF	ENG	Andy McAvoy
5	DF	ENG	Martin Taylor
6	DF	ENG	Keith Brown
7	MF	NIR	Garth Scates
8	MF	ENG	David Dunn
9	FW	NIR	Jonathan Topley (substituted off) 74'
10	FW	NIR	Gary Hamilton
11	MF	IRL	Ciarán Ryan (substituted off) 71'
Sub	MF	ENG	Ryan Baldacchino (substituted on) 71'
Sub	MF	NIR	Darren Dunning
Sub		ENG	Craig Woodfield (substituted on) 74'

Everton
No.	Pos.	Nation	Player
1	GK	IRL	Dean Delaney
2	DF	ENG	Carl Regan
3	DF	ENG	Adam Eaton
4	MF	ENG	Edward O'Brien (substituted off) 82'
5	DF	ENG	Adam Farley
6	DF	IRL	Richard Dunne
7	MF	ENG	David Poppleton
8	MF	ENG	Leon Osman
9	FW	ENG	Danny Cadamarteri
10	FW	ENG	Phil Jevons (substituted off) 72'
11	MF	ENG	Jamie Milligan
Sub	DF	ENG	Tony Hibbert (substituted on) 82'
Sub	FW	ENG	Francis Jeffers (substituted on) 72'
Sub	FW	ENG	David Knowles

=== Second leg ===
7 May 1998

Everton	2–2	Blackburn Rovers
Jeffers 2'; Eaton 69'	Report	Hamilton 52'; Hawe 83'

Goodison Park, Liverpool
Attendance: 15,258
Referee: Neale Barry

Note: Flags indicate national team as defined under FIFA eligibility rules; some limited exceptions apply. Players may hold more than one non-FIFA nationality.

Everton
No.	Pos.	Nation	Player
1	GK	IRL	Dean Delaney
2	DF	ENG	Carl Regan
3	DF	ENG	Adam Eaton
4	MF	ENG	Edward O'Brien
5	DF	ENG	Adam Farley
6	DF	IRL	Richard Dunne
7	MF	ENG	David Poppleton
8	FW	ENG	Francis Jeffers (substituted off) 85'
9	FW	ENG	Danny Cadamarteri
10	FW	ENG	Phil Jevons
11	MF	ENG	Jamie Milligan
Sub	DF	ENG	Tony Hibbert (substituted on) 85'
Sub	MF	ENG	Kevin McLeod
Sub	FW	ENG	David Knowles

Blackburn Rovers
No.	Pos.	Nation	Player
1	GK	ENG	Gareth Stewart
2	DF	ENG	Leam Richardson
3	DF	IRL	Peter Murphy
4	MF	ENG	Andy McAvoy
5	DF	ENG	Martin Taylor
6	DF	ENG	Keith Brown (substituted off) 71'
7	MF	NIR	Garth Scates
8	MF	ENG	David Dunn
9	FW	NIR	Jonathan Topley (substituted off) 82'
10	FW	NIR	Gary Hamilton
11	MF	ENG	Ryan Baldacchino (substituted off) 66'
Sub	MF	IRL	Ciarán Ryan (substituted on) 66'
Sub	MF	NIR	Patrick Connolly (substituted on) 82'
Sub	DF	NIR	Steven Hawe (substituted on) 71'

== 1998–99: West Ham United v. Coventry (3–0 and 6–0, 9–0 aggregate) ==
=== Second leg ===
14 May 1999

West Ham United	6–0	Coventry City
Brayley (2); Garcia (2); Newton; Carrick	Report

Boleyn Ground, London
Attendance: 21,500
Referee: Rob Harris

Note: Flags indicate national team as defined under FIFA eligibility rules; some limited exceptions apply. Players may hold more than one non-FIFA nationality.

West Ham United
No.	Pos.	Nation	Player
1	GK	ENG	Stephen Bywater
2	DF	SKN	Adam Newton
3	DF	ENG	Sam Taylor
4	DF	ENG	Terrell Forbes
5	DF	ENG	Izzy Iriekpen
6	DF	ENG	Stevland Angus
7	MF	AUS	Michael Ferrante
8	MF	ENG	Joe Cole
9	FW	ENG	Bertie Brayley
10	FW	AUS	Richard Garcia
11	MF	ENG	Michael Carrick
Sub	DF	ENG	Anwar Uddin
Sub	MF	ENG	Louis Riddle
Sub		ENG	Ashley Cooper
Sub		ENG	Stephen Omonua

Coventry City
No.	Pos.	Nation	Player
1	GK	ENG	Chris Kirkland
2	DF	IRL	Gerard Mooney
3	DF	ENG	David Lewis
4	MF	ENG	Robert Betts
5	DF	ENG	Mark Burrows
6	DF	ENG	Thomas Cudworth
7	MF	ENG	Mark Graham
8	MF	ENG	Craig Pead
9	FW	ENG	Chukki Eribenne
10	FW	ENG	Gary McSheffrey
11	FW	SCO	Stephen McPhee
Sub	DF	ENG	Calum Davenport
Sub	MF	SCO	Craig Strachan
Sub	MF	IRL	Daire Doyle
Sub		ENG	Martin Grant
