= Leeds United F.C. Under-21s and Academy =

Coordinates: 53°55′00.7″N 1°20′13.5″W

Leeds United Under-21s
- Full name: Leeds United Football Club Under-21s
- Nickname: The Whites
- Founded: 1919
- Ground: Thorp Arch
- Capacity: N/A
- Owner: 49ers Enterprises
- Chairman: Paraag Marathe
- Manager: Scott Gardner
- League: Premier League 2
- 2023–24: Premier League 2, 24th of 26
- Website: leedsunited.com
Home colours	Away colours

Leeds United Football Club Under-21s is the most senior of Leeds United's youth teams and the club's former reserve team.

As of the 2023–24 season, they play in the Premier League 2 : Division 1, the top tier of the Professional Development League, following promotion from Division 2 of the 2022–23 Professional U21 Development League.

== History ==
The under-23s replaced the club's under-21 team in 2016, which had replaced the reserve team in 2012 following the English game's reform of the youth football and the introduction of the Elite Player Performance Plan. The club was initially awarded Category Two status but upgraded to Category One in 2020.

== Player eligibility ==
For the 2026–27 season player eligibility is restricted to under-21 players born after 1 January 2005. Only players born after 1 January 2008 (primarily scholars), are eligible to play for the Under 18s.

== Current players ==
Italics denotes player has received a call up to the international age group squad but did not or has yet to receive a cap at that level.

Young Professionals
Nationality	Number	Name	Place of Birth	Date of Birth	Position	International	Other
(Australia)	58	Robbie Cook	Australia	27 January 2007 (age 19)	GK	Australia u20	
(England)	—	Oliver Wood	England		GK		
(England)	—	Coban Bird	Pontefract, England	5 November 2006 (age 19)	DF		
(England)	—	Louie Dudley	England	13 November 2007 (age 18)	DF		
(Nigeria)	62	Louis Enahoro-Marcus	Benin City, Nigeria	6 September 2006 (age 20)	DF		
(Australia)	—	Will Firth	Australia	11 September 2007 (age 19)	DF		
(England)	—	Joshua Hamilton	England	15 September 2007 (age 19)	DF	England U17	
(England)	—	Jacob Howard	England	29 March 2009 (age 17)	DF	England U17	
(England)	—	Jack Morris	England	25 January 2008 (age 18)	DF		
(Nigeria)	—	Leonard Ngenge	Lagos, Nigeria	12 September 2007 (age 19)	DF	Nigeria	
(England)	75	Louie Philpott	England	26 August 2009 (age 17)	DF		
(England)	—	Sam Alker	England	13 March 2009 (age 17)	MF	England U16	
(Serbia)	—	Edward Ibrović-Fletcher	Leeds, England	26 September 2008 (age 18)	MF	Serbia U19	
(England)	63	Freddie Lane	England	24 September 2007 (age 19)	MF		
(Scotland)	55	Josh McDonald	Scotland	6 March 2007 (age 19)	MF	Scotland U17	
(England)	66	Ollie Pickles	England	11 October 2007 (age 19)	MF		
(England)	60	Harvey Vincent	England	20 March 2007 (age 19)	MF	England U16	
(England)	73	Loui Whitehead	England	5 December 2008 (age 17)	MF		
(Italy)	—	Kenneth Mensah	England	5 January 2009 (age 17)	FW	Italy U16	
(North Macedonia)	51	Ditmir Hodja	North Macedonia	8 August 2008 (age 18)	FW	North Macedonia U19	
2026–27 Out on Loan
(England)	—	George Kenyon	England	23 March 2008 (age 18)	GK		Ramsbottom United
(England)	—	Reuben Lopata-White	Bradford, England	26 September 2005 (age 21)	DF		Altrincham
(Northern Ireland)	68	Luke Matykiewicz	England	2 September 2007 (age 19)	DF	Northern Ireland U19	Ilkeston Town
(England)	45	Harry Gray	England	8 October 2008 (age 18)	FW	England U17	Sheffield Wednesday
(Wales)	40	Charlie Crew	Cardiff, Wales	15 June 2006 (age 20)	MF	Wales	Walsall
(England)	67	Jacob Render	England	20 March 2008 (age 18)	MF		Darlington
2026–27 Scholars
(England)	—	George Banks	England		GK		
(England)	—	Oliver Herrick	England		GK		
(England)	—	Joshua Woolfrey	England	15 October 2009 (age 16)	GK		
(England)	90	Liam Balmer	England	8 November 2008 (age 17)	DF		
(England)	—	Isaac Bridge	England	11 September 2008 (age 18)	DF		
(England)	—	Lloyd Chambers	England		DF		
(England)	—	Alex Massey	England		DF		
(England)	—	Miller Megson	England	25 March 2009 (age 17)	DF		
(England)	—	Aiden Thompson	England	19 December 2008 (age 17)	DF		
(Wales)	—	Alfie Walker	England	3 September 2009 (age 17)	DF	Wales U17	
(England)	—	Jacob Watson	England		DF		
(England)	—	Oliver Bennett	England	26 November 2009 (age 16)	MF		
(India)	—	Joe Bhaskaran	England		MF		
(England)	—	Marley Hazell-Schofield	England		MF		
(England)	—	Owen Heywood	England	4 March 2010 (age 16)	MF		
(Austria)	—	Marlon Mensah	England		MF	Austria U15	
(Republic of Ireland)	—	Kai Morrall	Ireland	5 February 2010 (age 16)	MF	Republic of Ireland U17	Liverpool U18
(England)	—	Thomas Stockton	England	20 February 2010 (age 16)	MF		
(England)	—	Zacharia van der Graaf	England		MF		
(England)	—	Zach Hitchen	England	20 August 2011 (age 15)	FW	England U15	
(England)	—	Oluwatobi Johnson	England		FW		
(Thailand)	—	Silva Mexes	Nottingham, England	15 March 2010 (age 16)	FW	Thailand U17	
(Cameroon)	—	Carrick Njinko			FW		
(England)	—	Bailey Watling	England		FW		
(England)	86	Logan White	England	21 September 2008 (age 18)	FW		

== Graduates ==
The following list includes players who have graduated from Leeds' youth system to make their senior debut for the first team. Players who have represented their national team at senior level are highlighted in bold.

- **(Australia) Harry Kewell**
- (Australia) Jamie McMaster
- (Bulgaria) Kun Temenuzhkov
- (England) Tomi Ameobi
- (England) Neil Aspin
- (England) Lewis Bate
- (England) Mick Bates
- **(England) David Batty**
- (England) Rod Belfitt
- (England) Jason Blunt
- (England) Rob Bowman
- (England) Aiden Butterworth
- (England) Sam Byram
- (England) Alex Cairns
- **(England) Scott Carson**
- (England) Oliver Casey
- **(England) Jack Charlton**
- (England) Jack Clarke
- (England) Terry Connor
- **(England) Lewis Cook**
- **(England) Terry Cooper**
- (England) Andy Couzens
- (England) Lewie Coyle
- (England) Charlie Cresswell
- (England) Leif Davis
- (England) James Debayo
- **(England) Fabian Delph**
- (England) Tyler Denton
- (England) Cody Drameh
- (England) Ryan Edmondson
- (England) Tom Elliott
- (England) Gareth Evans
- (England) Mark Ford
- (England) Jamie Forrester
- (England) Scott Gardner
- (England) Robbie Gotts
- (England) Archie Gray
- (England) Harry Gray
- (England) Simon Grayson
- (England) Jimmy Greenhoff
- (England) Sam Greenwood
- (England) Tony Hackworth
- (England) Grenville Hair
- (England) Peter Hampton
- (England) Terry Hibbitt
- (England) Jonny Howson
- (England) Will Huffer
- **(England) Norman Hunter**
- (England) Mark Jackson
- (England) Jack Jenkins
- (England) Simon Johnson
- (England) Matthew Kilgallon
- (England) Tom Lees
- **(England) Aaron Lennon**
- (England) John Lukic
- **(England) Paul Madeley**
- (England) Lee Matthews
- **(England) James Milner**
- (England) Alex Mowatt
- (England) Ben Parker
- (England) Tom Pearce
- **(England) Kalvin Phillips**
- **(England) Paul Robinson**
- **(England) Paul Reaney**
- (England) Frazer Richardson
- (England) Scott Sellars
- (England) Jamie Shackleton
- (England) Kevin Sharp
- (England) Paul Shepherd
- **(England) Alan Smith**
- (England) Peter Swan
- (England) Charlie Taylor
- (England) Mark Tinkler
- (England) Simon Walton
- (England) Noel Whelan
- (England) Mallik Wilks
- **(England) Jonathan Woodgate**
- **(Guinea-Bissau) Ronaldo Vieira**
- **(Kenya) Clarke Oduor**
- (Netherlands) Pascal Struijk
- (Northern Ireland) Wesley Boyle
- **(Northern Ireland) Alfie McCalmont**
- **(Northern Ireland) Bailey Peacock-Farrell**
- (Norway) Tommy Knarvik
- (Republic of Ireland) Robert Bayly
- **(Republic of Ireland) Ian Harte**
- **(Republic of Ireland) Denis Irwin**
- **(Republic of Ireland) Gary Kelly**
- **(Republic of Ireland) Andy Keogh**
- (Republic of Ireland) Simon Madden
- **(Republic of Ireland) Alan Maybury**
- **(Republic of Ireland) Stephen McPhail**
- **(Republic of Ireland) Terry Phelan**
- **(Republic of Ireland) John Sheridan**
- (Republic of Ireland) Eoghan Stokes
- (Republic of Ireland) Aidy White
- **(Saint Lucia) Dominic Poleon**
- **(Scotland) Billy Bremner**
- (Scotland) Sam Chambers
- **(Scotland) Andy Gray**
- **(Scotland) Eddie Gray**
- **(Scotland) Frank Gray**
- **(Scotland) David Harvey**
- **(Scotland) Peter Lorimer**
- (Scotland) Stuart McKinstry
- (Scotland) Martin Woods
- (Scotland) Tommy Wright
- (Spain) Mateo Joseph
- **(Wales) John Charles**
- (Wales) **Charlie Crew**
- (Wales) Chris Dawson
- (Wales) Neil Edwards
- **(Wales) Carl Harris**
- (Wales) Niall Huggins
- **(Wales) Matthew Jones**
- **(Wales) Gary Speed**
- **(Wales) Gary Sprake**
- **(Wales) Byron Stevenson**
- **(Wales) Terry Yorath**

=== Other Professionals ===
- (Australia) Adam Berry
- (Australia) Shane Cansdell-Sherriff
- (Cameroon) Bobby Kamwa
- (England) Daniel Batty
- (England) James Baxendale
- (England) David Brown
- (England) Liam Darville
- (England) Max Dean
- (England) Kevin Dixon
- (England) Matty Edwards
- (England) Josh Falkingham
- (England) Craig Farrell
- (England) Martin Foster
- (England) Luke Garbutt
- (England) Ben Gordon
- (England) Will Hatfield
- (England) Sean Hessey
- (England) Sam Hird
- (England) Elliot Kebbie
- **(Liberia) Nohan Kenneh**
- (England) Liam Kitching
- (England) Nathan Lowndes
- (England) Sean McGurk
- (England) Tom Newey
- (England) Paul Pettinger
- (England) Jamie Price
- **(England) Danny Rose**
- (England) Neil Ross
- (England) Gavin Rothery
- **(England) John Scales**
- **(England) David Seaman**
- (England) Harpal Singh
- (England) Matthew Smithard
- (England) George Swan
- (England) Tom Taiwo
- (England) James Tavernier
- (England) Danny Ward
- (England) Michael Woods
- **(Gibraltar) Adam Priestley**
- **(Guinea-Bissau) Romario Vieira**
- **(Northern Ireland) Warren Feeney**
- (Republic of Ireland) Alan Cawley
- (Republic of Ireland) Barry Corr
- **(Republic of Ireland) Caleb Folan**
- (Republic of Ireland) Paul Keegan
- (Republic of Ireland) Damian Lynch
- (Republic of Ireland) Henry McStay
- (Republic of Ireland) Ian Morris
- **(Scotland) Tom Cairney**
- (Scotland) Jeremiah Chilokoa-Mullen
- **(Scotland) Oli McBurnie**
- (Scotland) Andrew Milne
- (Scotland) Kevin Smith
- (Scotland) Jamie Winter
- (South Africa) Chad Harpur
- (South Africa) Max McMillan
- (Wales) Kevin Aherne-Evans
- (Wales) Lawrence Davies
- (Wales) Ryan Nicholls
- (Wales) Craig Stiens
- (Zimbabwe) Ethan Kachosa

== Honours ==
=== Reserves ===
League

- The Central League (Tier 1) Winners (2): 1936–37, 1997–98
- The Central League, Division One East (Tier 2) Winners (2): 2008–09, 2009–10

Cup

- West Riding Senior Cup Winners (2): 1926–27, 1963–64

=== Under 23s ===
League

- Premier League 2 Division 2 Champions (1): 2020–21
- Professional Development League National Champions (1): 2018–19
- Professional Development League North Division Champions (1): 2018–19

=== Under 21s ===
Cup

- National League Cup Winners (1): 2024–25

=== Under 18s ===
League

- U18 Professional Development League North Division Champions (1): 2012–13
- U18 Professional Development League North Division Champions (1): 2017–18

Cup

- FA Youth Cup Winners (2): 1992–93, 1996–97

=== Under 17s ===
League

- FA Premier Academy League (Tier 1) Winners (1): 2002–03

Cup

- Milk Cup Winners (1): 2002

== Academy coaching staff ==
Position	Staff
Academy Manager	Adam Underwood
Head of Academy Coaching	Andy Foster
Head Of National Academy Recruitment	Lyndon Tomlinson
Head Of Emerging Talent	Craig Dean
Under 21s Manager	Paco Gallardo
Under 21s Coach	Michael Pujdak
Under 18s Manager	Graft
Under 18s Coach	Rob Etherington

=== Academy Directors ===
From	To	Name	Notes
1992	1997	Paul Hart	
1998	2000	Alan Hill	
1999	2000	Steve Beaglehole	Assistant
2000	2001	Brian Kidd	
2000	2001	Clive Richards	Assistant
2001	2005	Gary Worthington	Assistant
2002	2004	Andy Ritchie	
2004	2010	Neil Thompson	
2009	2010	Daral Pugh	Assistant
2010	2011	Gwyn Williams	Acting
2011	2012	Chris Sulley	
2012	2015	Steve Holmes	
2015	2016	Paul Hart	

=== Development Squad ===
From	To	Name	Notes
2012	2014	Neil Redfearn	
2014	2015	Jason Blunt	Acting
2015	2016	Paul Hart	
2016	2017	Jason Blunt	Under 23s Coach
2017	2020	Carlos Corberán	Under 23s Coach
2020	2022	Mark Jackson	Under 23s Coach

=== Reserves ===
From	To	Name	Notes
1948	1960	Willis Edwards	
1967	1975	Cyril Patridge	
1978	1980	Bryan Edwards	
1980	1991	Peter Gunby	
1995	1997	David Williams	
1997	1998	Eddie Gray	
2000	2003	Lucas Murtagh	
2003	2005	Steve Agnew	
2006	2006	David Geddis	
2006	2010	Neil Thompson	
2010	2012	Neil Redfearn	

=== Under 19s & 17s and 18s & 16s ===
From	To	Name	Position
2000	2004	Pop Robson	Under 17s Coach (2000–01), Under 19s Coach (2001–04)
2006	2007	Steve Agnew	Under 18s Coach
2007		Paul Beesley	Under 18s Coach
2007	2009	Daral Pugh	Under 16s Coach; Under 18s Coach (2007–09)
2009	2012	Neil Redfearn	Under 18s Coach
2012	2014	Richard Naylor	Under 18s Coach
2014	2015	Jason Blunt	Under 18s Coach
2015	2016	John Anderson	Under 18s Manager
2016	2017	Andy Gray	Under 18s Coach
2016	2020	Mark Jackson	Under 18s Coach
2020	present	Scott Gardner	Under 18s Coach
