= 1996–97 Leeds United A.F.C. season =

1996–97 football season

Leeds United
1996–97 season
- Chairman: Bill Fotherby
- Manager: Howard Wilkinson (until 9 September); George Graham (from 10 September)
- Stadium: Elland Road
- Premier League: 11th
- FA Cup: Fifth round
- League Cup: Third round
- Top goalscorer: League: Brian Deane; Lee Sharpe (5 each); All: Rod Wallace (8)
- Highest home attendance: 39,981 vs Liverpool (19 November 1996, Premier League)
- Lowest home attendance: 15,230 vs Darlington (18 September 1996, League Cup)
- Average home league attendance: 32,109

The 1996–97 season saw Leeds United competing in the Premier League (known as the FA Carling Premiership for sponsorship reasons) for a fifth successive season.

== Competitions ==
=== Premier League ===
==== League table ====
Pos	Team	Pld	W	D	L	GF	GA	GD	Pts	Qualification or relegation
9	Leicester City	38	12	11	15	46	54	−8	47	Qualification for the UEFA Cup first round (Note: Leicester City qualified for the UEFA Cup as League Cup winners.)
10	Tottenham Hotspur	38	13	7	18	44	51	−7	46	
11	Leeds United	38	11	13	14	28	38	−10	46	
12	Derby County	38	11	13	14	45	58	−13	46	
13	Blackburn Rovers	38	9	15	14	42	43	−1	42	

Source: Premier League
Rules for classification: 1) points; 2) goal difference; 3) number of goals scored.
Notes:

Results summary

Overall								Home						Away					
Pld	W	D	L	GF	GA	GD	Pts	W	D	L	GF	GA	GD	W	D	L	GF	GA	GD
38	11	13	14	28	38	−10	46	7	7	5	15	13	+2	4	6	9	13	25	−12

Source: Statto

Results by round

Round	1	2	3	4	5	6	7	8	9	10	11	12	13	14	15	16	17	18	19	20	21	22	23	24	25	26	27	28	29	30	31	32	33	34	35	36	37	38
Ground	A	H	H	A	H	A	H	A	H	A	A	H	H	A	H	A	H	A	H	A	A	H	A	H	H	A	A	H	H	H	A	A	H	A	A	H	A	H
Result	D	L	W	W	L	L	L	L	W	L	L	W	L	W	W	D	D	D	L	L	L	W	W	D	D	L	W	W	W	D	L	D	D	L	D	D	D	D
Position	7	14	11	6	9	12	14	17	14	16	17	17	17	14	12	13	13	12	14	15	15	12	11	10	11	11	9	9	9	9	9	9	10	11	10	9	11	11

Source: Statto.com
A = Away; H = Home; W = Win; D = Draw; L = Loss

=== Premier League ===
Date	Opponent	Venue	Result	Attendance	Scorers
17 August 1996	Derby County	A	3–3	17,927	Laursen (own goal), Bowyer, Harte
20 August 1996	Sheffield Wednesday	H	0–2	31,011	
24 August 1996	Wimbledon	H	1–0	25,860	Sharpe
4 September 1996	Blackburn Rovers	A	1–0	23,226	Harte
7 September 1996	Manchester United	H	0–4	39,694	
14 September 1996	Coventry City	A	1–2	17,297	Couzens
21 September 1996	Newcastle United	H	0–1	36,070	
28 September 1996	Leicester City	A	0–1	20,359	
12 October 1996	Nottingham Forest	H	2–0	29,225	Wallace (2)
19 October 1996	Aston Villa	A	0–2	39,051	
26 October 1996	Arsenal	A	0–3	38,076	
2 November 1996	Sunderland	H	3–0	31,667	Ford, Sharpe, Deane
16 November 1996	Liverpool	H	0–2	39,981	
23 November 1996	Southampton	A	2–0	15,241	Kelly, Sharpe
30 November 1996	Chelsea	H	2–0	32,671	Deane, Rush
3 December 1996	Middlesbrough	A	0–0	30,018	
7 December 1996	Tottenham Hotspur	H	0–0	33,783	
21 December 1996	Everton	A	0–0	36,954	
26 December 1996	Coventry City	H	1–3	36,465	Deane
28 December 1996	Manchester United	A	0–1	55,256	
1 January 1997	Newcastle United	A	0–3	36,489	
11 January 1997	Leicester City	H	3–0	29,486	Bowyer, Rush (2)
20 January 1997	West Ham United	A	2–0	19,441	Kelly, Bowyer
29 January 1997	Derby County	H	0–0	27,549	
1 February 1997	Arsenal	H	0–0	35,502	
19 February 1997	Liverpool	A	0–4	38,957	
22 February 1997	Sunderland	A	1–0	21,890	Bowyer
1 March 1997	West Ham United	H	1–0	30,575	Sharpe
8 March 1997	Everton	H	1–0	32,055	Molenaar
12 March 1997	Southampton	H	0–0	25,913	
15 March 1997	Tottenham Hotspur	A	0–1	33,040	
22 March 1997	Sheffield Wednesday	A	2–2	30,373	Sharpe, Wallace
7 April 1997	Blackburn Rovers	H	0–0	27,264	
16 April 1997	Wimbledon	A	0–2	7,979	
19 April 1997	Nottingham Forest	A	1–1	25,565	Deane
22 April 1997	Aston Villa	H	0–0	26,897	
3 May 1997	Chelsea	A	0–0	28,277	
11 May 1997	Middlesbrough	H	1–1	38,567	Deane

=== FA Cup ===
Round	Date	Opponent	Venue	Result	Attendance	Goalscorers
Round Three	14 January 1997	Crystal Palace	A	2–2	21,052	Deane, Andersen (own goal)
Round Three Replay	25 January 1997	Crystal Palace	H	1–0	21,903	Wallace
Round Four	4 February 1997	Arsenal	A	1–0	38,115	Wallace
Round Five	15 February 1997	Portsmouth	H	2–3	35,604	Bowyer (2)

=== League Cup ===
Round	Date	Opponent	Venue	Result	Attendance	Goalscorers
Round Two First-Leg	18 September 1996	Darlington	H	2–2	15,711	Wallace (2)
Round Two Second-Leg	24 September 1996	Darlington	A	2–0 (won 4–2 on agg)	6,298	Wallace, Harte
Round Three	23 October 1996	Aston Villa	H	1–2	15,803	Sharpe

== Statistics ==
No.	Pos.	Name	League		FA Cup		League Cup		Total		Discipline	
No.	Pos.	Name	Apps	Goals	Apps	Goals	Apps	Goals	Apps	Goals	Yellow card	Red card
1	GK	(England) Nigel Martyn	37	0	4	0	3	0	44	0	1	0
2	DF	(Republic of Ireland) Gary Kelly	34+2	2	4	0	3	0	41+2	2	6	0
3	DF	(England) Tony Dorigo	15+3	0	4	0	0	0	19+3	0	4	0
4	DF	(England) Carlton Palmer	26+2	0	3	0	2	0	31+2	0	9	1
5	DF	(South Africa) Lucas Radebe	28+4	0	3	0	1	0	32+4	1	5	0
6	DF	(England) David Wetherall	25+3	0	1+1	0	2+1	0	28+5	0	8	0
7	FW	(England) Lee Sharpe	26	5	0+1	0	3	1	29+1	6	1	0
8	FW	(England) Rod Wallace	17+5	3	4	2	3	3	24+5	8	4	0
9	FW	(Wales) Ian Rush	34+2	3	2+2	0	2	0	38+5	3	6	0
10	FW	(England) Brian Deane	27+1	5	4	1	0	0	31+1	6	3	0
11	MF	(England) Lee Bowyer	32	4	4	2	0	0	36	6	8	0
14	FW	(England) Andy Gray	1+5	0	0	0	2	0	3+5	0	1	0
15	GK	(England) Mark Beeney	1	0	0	0	0	0	1	0	0	0
16	DF	(England) Richard Jobson	10	0	0	0	3	0	13	0	2	0
17	FW	(Scotland) Derek Lilley	4+2	0	0	0	0	0	4+2	0	0	0
17	MF	(England) Mark Tinkler	1+2	0	0	0	0	0	1+2	0	0	0
18	DF	(Norway) Gunnar Halle	20	0	3	0	0	0	23	0	3	0
19	FW	(Australia) Harry Kewell	0+1	0	0	0	0	0	0+1	0	0	0
20	DF	(Republic of Ireland) Ian Harte	10+4	2	1	0	2+1	1	13+5	3	2	0
21	FW	(Ghana) Tony Yeboah	6+1	0	0	0	0	0	6+1	0	2	0
22	MF	(England) Mark Ford	15+1	1	0	0	3	0	18+1	0	5	0
23	MF	(England) Andy Couzens	7+3	1	0	0	3	0	10+3	1	2	0
24	MF	(England) Jason Blunt	0+1	0	0	0	0+1	0	0+2	0	0	0
25	FW	(France) Pierre Laurent	2+2	0	0	0	0	0	2+2	0	0	0
26	DF	(England) Paul Beesley	11+1	0	1	0	1	0	13+1	0	6	0
28	DF	(England) Paul Shepherd	1	0	0	0	0	0	1	0	0	0
29	DF	(England) Mark Jackson	11+6	0	4	0	0	0	15+6	0	1	0
30	FW	(England) Mark Hateley	5+1	0	0	0	0	0	5+1	0	0	0
30	DF	(Netherlands) Robert Molenaar	12	1	2	0	0	0	14	1	6	0
33	DF	(Northern Ireland) Wesley Boyle	0+1	0	0	0	0	0	0+1	0	0	0

== Transfers ==
=== In ===
Date	Pos.	Name	From	Fee
20 May 1996	FW	(Wales) Ian Rush	(England) Liverpool	Free
5 July 1996	MF	(England) Lee Bowyer	(England) Charlton Athletic	£2,800,000
26 July 1996	GK	(England) Nigel Martyn	(England) Crystal Palace	£2,250,000
10 August 1996	FW	(England) Lee Sharpe	(England) Manchester United	£4,500,000
13 December 1996	DF	(Norway) Gunnar Halle	(England) Oldham Athletic	£500,000
11 January 1997	DF	(Netherlands) Robert Molenaar	(Netherlands) Volendam	£400,000
1 February 1997	DF	(France) Pierre Laurent	(France) Bastia	£250,000
27 March 1997	FW	(Scotland) Derek Lilley	(Scotland) Greenock Morton	£500,000

=== Out ===
Date	Pos.	Name	To	Fee
1 June 1996	FW	(South Africa) Phil Masinga	(Switzerland) St. Gallen	Free
1 July 1996	MF	(Wales) Gary Speed	(England) Everton	£3,400,000
1 July 1996	GK	(England) John Lukic	(England) Arsenal	Free
1 July 1996	DF	(Northern Ireland) Nigel Worthington	(England) Stoke City	Free
26 July 1996	MF	(Scotland) Gary McAllister	(England) Coventry City	£3,000,000
7 February 1997	DF	(England) Paul Beesley	(England) Manchester City	£500,000
21 February 1997	DF	(England) Rob Bowman	(England) Rotherham United	Free
26 March 1997	MF	(England) Mark Tinkler	(England) York City	£75,000

=== Loan in ===
Date from	Date to	Pos.	Name	From
18 August 1996	1 January 1997	FW	(England) Mark Hateley	(England) Queens Park Rangers

=== Loan out ===
Date from	Date to	Pos.	Name	From
20 August 1996	6 November 1996	FW	(Sweden) Tomas Brolin	(Switzerland) FC Zürich
24 December 1996	16 June 1997	FW	(Sweden) Tomas Brolin	(Italy) Parma
3 March 1997	1 June 1997	GK	(South Africa) Paul Evans	(England) Bradford City
31 March 1997	1 June 1997	DF	(England) Paul Shepherd	(Scotland) Ayr United
