= 1995–96 Leeds United A.F.C. season =

1995–96 season of Leeds United

Leeds United
1995–96 season
- Chairman: Leslie Silver (until 10 April); Bill Fotherby
- Manager: Howard Wilkinson
- Stadium: Elland Road
- Premier League: 13th
- FA Cup: Fifth round
- League Cup: Runners–up
- UEFA Cup: Second round
- Top goalscorer: League: Tony Yeboah (12); All: Tony Yeboah (19)
- Highest home attendance: 39,801 vs Manchester United (24 December 1995, Premier League)
- Lowest home attendance: 12,384 vs Notts County (19 September 1995, League Cup)
- Average home league attendance: 32,578

The 1995–96 season saw Leeds United competing in the Premier League (known as the FA Carling Premiership for sponsorship reasons) and the UEFA Cup.

== Competitions ==
=== Premier League ===
==== League table ====
Pos	Team	Pld	W	D	L	GF	GA	GD	Pts
11	Chelsea	38	12	14	12	46	44	+2	50
12	Middlesbrough	38	11	10	17	35	50	−15	43
13	Leeds United	38	12	7	19	40	57	−17	43
14	Wimbledon	38	10	11	17	55	70	−15	41
15	Sheffield Wednesday	38	10	10	18	48	61	−13	40

Source: Premier League
Rules for classification: 1) points; 2) goal difference; 3) number of goals scored.

Results summary

Overall								Home						Away					
Pld	W	D	L	GF	GA	GD	Pts	W	D	L	GF	GA	GD	W	D	L	GF	GA	GD
38	12	7	19	40	57	−17	43	8	3	8	21	21	0	4	4	11	19	36	−17

Source: Statto

Results by round

Round	1	2	3	4	5	6	7	8	9	10	11	12	13	14	15	16	17	18	19	20	21	22	23	24	25	26	27	28	29	30	31	32	33	34	35	36	37	38
Ground	A	H	H	A	A	H	A	H	H	A	H	A	H	A	H	H	A	H	A	A	H	H	A	A	A	H	A	A	H	H	H	A	H	A	A	H	H	A
Result	W	W	W	D	L	L	W	W	L	D	W	D	W	L	L	D	L	W	W	L	D	W	L	L	L	L	W	L	D	L	W	L	L	L	L	L	L	D
Position	5	1	1	2	4	7	6	4	7	8	8	8	5	8	9	9	9	9	8	10	11	9	11	11	11	12	12	12	12	12	12	12	13	13	13	13	13	13

Source: Statto.com
A = Away; H = Home; W = Win; D = Draw; L = Loss

=== Premier League ===
Date	Opponent	Venue	Result	Attendance	Scorers
19 August 1995	West Ham United	A	2–1	22,901	Yeboah (2)
21 August 1995	Liverpool	H	1–0	35,852	Yeboah
26 August 1995	Aston Villa	H	2–0	35,086	Speed, White
30 August 1995	Southampton	A	1–1	15,212	Dorigo
9 September 1995	Tottenham Hotspur	A	1–2	30,034	Yeboah
16 September 1995	Queens Park Rangers	H	1–3	31,504	Wetherall
23 September 1995	Wimbledon	A	4–2	13,307	Palmer, Yeboah (3)
30 September 1995	Sheffield Wednesday	H	2–0	29,462	Speed, Yeboah
14 October 1995	Arsenal	H	0–3	38,552	
21 October 1995	Manchester City	A	0–0	26,390	
28 October 1995	Coventry City	H	3–1	30,161	McAllister (3)
4 November 1995	Middlesbrough	A	1–1	29,467	Deane
18 November 1995	Chelsea	H	1–0	36,209	Yeboah
25 November 1995	Newcastle United	A	1–2	36,572	Deane
2 December 1995	Manchester City	H	0–1	33,249	
9 December 1995	Wimbledon	H	1–1	27,984	Jobson
16 December 1995	Sheffield Wednesday	A	2–6	24,573	Brolin, Wallace
24 December 1995	Manchester United	H	3–1	39,801	Deane, Yeboah, McAllister (pen)
27 December 1995	Bolton Wanderers	A	2–0	18,414	Brolin, Wetherall
30 December 1995	Everton	A	0–2	40,009	
1 January 1996	Blackburn Rovers	H	0–0	31,285	
13 January 1996	West Ham United	H	2–0	30,658	Brolin (2)
20 January 1996	Liverpool	A	0–5	40,254	
31 January 1996	Nottingham Forest	A	1–2	24,465	Palmer
3 February 1996	Aston Villa	A	0–3	35,982	
2 March 1996	Bolton Wanderers	H	0–1	30,106	
6 March 1996	Queens Park Rangers	A	2–1	13,991	Yeboah (2)
13 March 1996	Blackburn Rovers	A	0–1	23,358	
17 March 1996	Everton	H	2–2	29,421	Deane (2)
30 March 1996	Middlesbrough	H	0–1	31,778	
3 April 1996	Southampton	H	1–0	26,077	Deane
6 April 1996	Arsenal	A	1–2	37,619	Deane
8 April 1996	Nottingham Forest	H	1–3	29,220	Wetherall
13 April 1996	Chelsea	A	1–4	22,131	McAllister
17 April 1996	Manchester United	A	0–1	48,382	
29 April 1996	Newcastle United	H	0–1	38,862	
2 May 1996	Tottenham Hotspur	H	1–3	30,061	Wetherall
5 May 1996	Coventry City	A	0–0	22,769	

=== FA Cup ===
Round	Date	Opponent	Venue	Result	Attendance	Goalscorers
Round Three	7 January 1996	Derby County	A	4–2	16,155	Deane, Speed, Yeboah, McAllister
Round Four	14 February 1996	Bolton Wanderers	A	1–0	16,694	Wallace
Round Five	21 February 1996	Port Vale	H	0–0	18,607	
Round Five Replay	27 February 1996	Port Vale	A	2–1	14,023	McAllister (2)
Quarter-Final	10 March 1996	Liverpool	H	0–0	34,632	
Quarter-Final Replay	20 March 1996	Liverpool	A	0–3	30,812	

=== League Cup ===
Round	Date	Opponent	Venue	Result	Attendance	Goalscorers
Round Two First-Leg	19 September 1995	Notts County	H	0–0	12,384	
Round Two Second-Leg	3 October 1995	Notts County	A	3–2 (won 3–2 on agg)	6,867	Speed, Couzens, McAllister
Round Three	25 October 1995	Derby County	A	1–0	11,873	Speed
Round Four	29 November 1995	Blackburn Rovers	H	2–1	26,006	Deane, Yeboah
Round Five	10 January 1996	Reading	H	2–1	21,023	Speed, Masinga
Semi-Final First-Leg	11 February 1996	Birmingham City	A	2–1	24,781	Whyte (own goal), Yeboah
Semi-Final Second-Leg	25 February 1996	Birmingham City	H	3–0 (won 5–1 on agg)	35,435	Deane, Yeboah, Masinga
Final	24 March 1996	Aston Villa	N	0–3	77,065	

=== UEFA Cup ===
Round	Date	Opponent	Venue	Result	Attendance	Goalscorers
Round One First-Leg	12 September 1995	AS Monaco	A	3–0	14,000	Yeboah (3)
Round One Second-Leg	26 September 1995	AS Monaco	H	0–1 (won 3–1 on agg)	24,501	
Round Two First-Leg	25 October 1995	PSV Eindhoven	H	3–5	24,846	Speed, Palmer, McAllister
Round Two Second-Leg	29 November 1995	PSV Eindhoven	A	0–3	25,750	

== Statistics ==
No.	Pos.	Name	League		FA Cup		League Cup		UEFA Cup		Total		Discipline	
No.	Pos.	Name	Apps	Goals	Apps	Goals	Apps	Goals	Apps	Goals	Apps	Goals	Yellow card	Red card
1	GK	(England) John Lukic	28	0	5	0	7	0	4	0	44	0	0	0
2	DF	(Republic of Ireland) Gary Kelly	34	0	5	0	8	0	4	51	0	0	4	1
3	DF	(England) Tony Dorigo	17	1	3	0	4	0	2	0	26	0	2	0
4	DF	(England) Carlton Palmer	33	2	6	0	8	0	4	1	51	3	8	0
5	DF	(South Africa) Lucas Radebe	10+3	0	3+1	0	1+2	0	0	0	14+6	0	2	0
6	DF	(England) David Wetherall	34	4	5	0	8	0	4	0	51	4	5	0
7	FW	(South Africa) Phil Masinga	5+4	0	1	0	2	2	0	0	8+4	2	1	0
8	FW	(England) Rod Wallace	12+12	1	3+1	1	3+1	0	0+1	0	18+15	2	1	0
9	FW	(England) Brian Deane	30+4	7	3+3	1	5+2	2	3	0	41+9	10	5	0
10	MF	(Scotland) Gary McAllister	36	5	6	3	8	1	4	1	54	10	1	0
11	MF	(Wales) Gary Speed	29	2	4	1	7	3	4	1	44	7	2	0
12	DF	(England) John Pemberton	16+2	0	1+1	0	3	0	4	0	24+3	0	7	1
13	GK	(England) Mark Beeney	10	0	1	0	1	0	0	0	12	0	0	1
14	FW	(England) David White	1+3	1	0	0	1	0	1+1	0	3+4	1	0	0
15	DF	(Northern Ireland) Nigel Worthington	12+4	0	3	0	2+1	0	0	0	17+5	0	5	0
16	DF	(England) Richard Jobson	12	1	1	0	0	0	0	0	13	1	2	0
17	MF	(England) Mark Tinkler	5+4	0	0	0	1	0	0+1	0	6+5	0	2	0
18	FW	(Sweden) Tomas Brolin	17+2	4	1+1	0	2+2	0	0	0	20+5	4	4	0
19	FW	(England) Noel Whelan	3+5	0	0	0	0+2	0	3	0	6+7	0	0	0
20	DF	(England) Kevin Sharp	0+1	0	0	0	0	0	0+1	0	0+2	0	0	0
21	FW	(Ghana) Tony Yeboah	22	12	6	1	7	3	4	3	39	19	1	0
22	MF	(England) Mark Ford	12	0	5	0	4	0	0+1	0	21+1	0	3	0
23	MF	(England) Andy Couzens	8+6	0	0	0	1+1	1	0+2	0	9+9	1	1	0
24	FW	(England) Lee Chapman	2	0	0	0	0	0	0	0	2	0	0	1
25	FW	(England) Rob Bowman	1+2	0	0+1	0	0	0	0	0+1	1+3	0	0	0
26	DF	(England) Paul Beesley	8+2	0	4	0	4+1	0	2+2	0	18+5	2	0	0
27	FW	(England) Andy Gray	12+3	0	0+2	0	1+1	0	0	0	13+6	0	0	0
29	DF	(Republic of Ireland) Ian Harte	2+2	0	0	0	0+1	0	0	0	2+3	0	0	0
31	DF	(England) Mark Jackson	0+1	0	0	0	0	0	0	0	0+1	0	0	0
32	DF	(Republic of Ireland) Alan Maybury	1	0	0	0	0	0	0	0	1	0	0	0
33	FW	(Australia) Harry Kewell	2	0	0	0	0	0	0	0	2	0	0	0
34	MF	(England) Jason Blunt	2+1	0	0	0	0	0	0	0	2+1	0	0	0

== Transfers ==
=== In ===
Date	Pos.	Name	From	Fee
2 August 1995	DF	(England) Paul Beesley	(England) Sheffield United	£250,000
26 October 1995	DF	(England) Richard Jobson	(England) Oldham Athletic	£1,000,000
7 November 1995	FW	(Sweden) Tomas Brolin	(Italy) Parma	£4,500,000

=== Out ===
Date	Pos.	Name	To	Fee
4 July 1995	DF	(England) Chris Fairclough	(England) Bolton Wanderers	£500,000
16 September 1995	DF	(Republic of Ireland) David O'Leary	Retired	
2 November 1995	MF	(England) David White	(England) Sheffield United	£500,000
30 November 1995	DF	(England) Kevin Sharp	(England) Wigan Athletic	£100,000
16 December 1995	FW	(England) Noel Whelan	(England) Coventry City	£2,000,000
28 March 1996	GK	(England) Paul Pettinger	(England) Coventry City	Free

=== Loan in ===
Date from	Date to	Pos.	Name	From
10 January 1996	1 March 1996	FW	(England) Lee Chapman	(England) Ipswich Town

=== Loan out ===
Date from	Date to	Pos.	Name	To
11 August 1995	1 March 1996	GK	(England) Paul Pettinger	(England) Rotherham United
