= 1999–2000 Leeds United A.F.C. season =

1999–2000 season of Leeds United

Leeds United
1999–2000 season
- Chairman: Peter Ridsdale
- Manager: David O'Leary
- Stadium: Elland Road
- Premier League: 3rd
- FA Cup: Fifth round
- League Cup: Fourth round
- UEFA Cup: Semi-finals
- Top goalscorer: League: Michael Bridges (19); All: Michael Bridges (21)
- Highest home attendance: 40,192 vs Newcastle United (25 September 1999, Premier League)
- Lowest home attendance: 11,912 vs Port Vale (12 December 1999, FA Cup)
- Average home league attendance: 37,579

The 1999–2000 season saw Leeds United competing in the Premier League (known as the FA Carling Premiership for sponsorship reasons) and the UEFA Cup.

== Competitions ==
=== Premier League ===
==== League table ====
Pos	Team	Pld	W	D	L	GF	GA	GD	Pts	Qualification or relegation
1	Manchester United (C)	38	28	7	3	97	45	+52	91	Qualification for the Champions League first group stage
2	Arsenal	38	22	7	9	73	43	+30	73	Qualification for the Champions League first group stage
3	Leeds United	38	21	6	11	58	43	+15	69	Qualification for the Champions League third qualifying round
4	Liverpool	38	19	10	9	51	30	+21	67	Qualification for the UEFA Cup first round (Note: Chelsea qualified for the UEFA Cup as FA Cup winners.)
5	Chelsea	38	18	11	9	53	34	+19	65	Qualification for the UEFA Cup first round

Source: Premier League
Rules for classification: 1) points; 2) goal difference; 3) number of goals scored.
(C) Champions

==== Results summary ====
Overall								Home						Away					
Pld	W	D	L	GF	GA	GD	Pts	W	D	L	GF	GA	GD	W	D	L	GF	GA	GD
38	21	6	11	58	43	+15	69	12	2	5	29	18	+11	9	4	6	29	25	+4

Source: 1999–2000 FA Premier League table

==== Results by round ====
Round	1	2	3	4	5	6	7	8	9	10	11	12	13	14	15	16	17	18	19	20	21	22	23	24	25	26	27	28	29	30	31	32	33	34	35	36	37	38
Ground	H	A	A	H	H	A	A	H	H	A	H	A	H	A	H	H	A	A	H	A	H	A	A	H	H	A	H	A	H	A	H	A	H	A	A	H	H	A
Result	D	W	L	W	L	W	W	W	W	W	W	D	W	L	W	W	W	W	W	L	L	W	L	W	L	D	W	W	W	L	L	L	L	D	W	W	D	D
Position	9	4	7	6	7	5	4	2	2	1	1	1	1	2	2	1	1	1	1	1	1	1	2	2	2	2	2	2	2	2	2	3	4	4	4	3	3	3

Source: Statto.com
A = Away; H = Home; W = Win; D = Draw; L = Loss

==== Matches ====
7 August 1999 1	Leeds United	0–0	Derby County	Leeds
		Report		Stadium: Elland Road; Attendance: 40,118; Referee: Graham Barber

11 August 1999 2	Southampton	0–3	Leeds United	Southampton
		Report	Bridges 10', 51', 72'	Stadium: The Dell; Attendance: 15,206; Referee: Alan Wiley

14 August 1999 3	Manchester United	2–0	Leeds United	Manchester
	Yorke 76', 80'	Report		Stadium: Old Trafford; Attendance: 55,187; Referee: Neale Barry

21 August 1999 4	Leeds United	2–1	Sunderland	Leeds
	Bowyer 51'; Mills 72'	Report	Phillips 37' (pen.)	Stadium: Elland Road; Attendance: 39,064; Referee: Paul Alcock

23 August 1999 5	Leeds United	1–2	Liverpool	Leeds
	Song 20' (o.g.)	Report	Camara 45'; Radebe 55' (o.g.)	Stadium: Elland Road; Attendance: 39,703; Referee: David Elleray

28 August 1999 6	Tottenham Hotspur	1–2	Leeds United	Haringey
	Sherwood 36'	Report	Smith 53'; Harte 83'	Stadium: White Hart Lane; Attendance: 36,012; Referee: Mike Reed

11 September 1999 7	Coventry City	3–4	Leeds United	Coventry
	McAllister 2' (pen.); Aloisi 17'; Chippo 54'	Report	Bowyer 7'; Huckerby 25'; Harte 33' (pen.); Bridges 60'	Stadium: Highfield Road; Attendance: 21,532; Referee: Steve Dunn

19 September 1999 8	Leeds United	2–0	Middlesbrough	Leeds
	Bridges 14'; Kewell 64'	Report		Stadium: Elland Road; Attendance: 34,122; Referee: Dermot Gallagher

25 September 1999 9	Leeds United	3–2	Newcastle United	Leeds
	Bowyer 11'; Kewell 39'; Bridges 77'	Report	Shearer 42', 57'	Stadium: Elland Road; Attendance: 40,192; Referee: Barry Knight

3 October 1999 10	Watford	1–2	Leeds United	Watford
	Williams 41'	Report	Bridges 44'; Kewell 69'	Stadium: Vicarage Road; Attendance: 19,677; Referee: Andy D'Urso

16 October 1999 11	Leeds United	2–0	Sheffield Wednesday	Leeds
	Smith 72', 78'	Report		Stadium: Elland Road; Attendance: 39,437; Referee: Graham Barber

24 October 1999 12	Everton	4–4	Leeds United	Liverpool
	Campbell 4', 28'; Hutchison 37'; Weir 90'		Bridges 15', 67'; Kewell 35'; Woodgate 72'	Stadium: Goodison Park; Attendance: 37,355; Referee: Dermot Gallagher

30 October 1999 13	Leeds United	1–0	West Ham United	Leeds
	Harte 52'	Report		Stadium: Elland Road; Attendance: 40,190; Referee: Graham Poll

7 November 1999 14	Wimbledon	2–0	Leeds United	Croydon
	Hartson 30'; Gayle 65'	Report		Stadium: Selhurst Park; Attendance: 18,747; Referee: Peter Jones

20 November 1999 15	Leeds United	2–1	Bradford City	Leeds
	Smith 54'; Harte 80' (pen.)	Report	Windass 90'	Stadium: Elland Road; Attendance: 39,937; Referee: Paul Durkin

28 November 1999 16	Leeds United	1–0	Southampton	Leeds
	Bridges 90'	Report		Stadium: Elland Road; Attendance: 39,288; Referee: Rob Harris

5 December 1999 17	Derby County	0–1	Leeds United	Derby
		Report	Harte 90' (pen.)	Stadium: Pride Park Stadium; Attendance: 29,455; Referee: Paul Alcock

19 December 1999 18	Chelsea	0–2	Leeds United	Fulham
		Report	McPhail 66', 87'	Stadium: Stamford Bridge; Attendance: 35,106; Referee: Jeff Winter

26 December 1999 19	Leeds United	2–1	Leicester City	Leeds
	Bridges 29'; Bowyer 45'	Report	Cottee 10'	Stadium: Elland Road; Attendance: 40,105; Referee: Mark Halsey

28 December 1999 20	Arsenal	2–0	Leeds United	Islington
	Ljungberg 32'; Henry 58'	Report		Stadium: Highbury; Attendance: 38,096; Referee: Graham Poll

3 January 2000 21	Leeds United	1–2	Aston Villa	Leeds
	Kewell 45'	Report	Southgate 17', 62'	Stadium: Elland Road; Attendance: 40,027; Referee: Uriah Rennie

23 January 2000 22	Sunderland	1–2	Leeds United	Sunderland
	Phillips 52'	Report	Wilcox 24'; Bridges 51'	Stadium: Stadium of Light; Attendance: 41,633; Referee: Peter Jones

5 February 2000 23	Liverpool	3–1	Leeds United	Liverpool
	Hamann 20'; Berger 69'; Murphy 90'	Report	Bowyer 62'	Stadium: Anfield; Attendance: 44,793; Referee: Mike Reed

12 February 2000 24	Leeds United	1–0	Tottenham Hotspur	Leeds
	Kewell 23'	Report		Stadium: Elland Road; Attendance: 40,127; Referee: Dermot Gallagher

20 February 2000 25	Leeds United	0–1	Manchester United	Leeds
		Report	Cole 52'	Stadium: Elland Road; Attendance: 40,160; Referee: Peter Jones

26 February 2000 26	Middlesbrough	0–0	Leeds United	Middlesbrough
		Report		Stadium: Riverside Stadium; Attendance: 34,800; Referee: Uriah Rennie

5 March 2000 27	Leeds United	3–0	Coventry City	Leeds
	Kewell 5'; Bridges 42'; Wilcox 85'	Report		Stadium: Elland Road; Attendance: 38,710; Referee: Jeff Winter

16 March 2000 28	Bradford City	1–2	Leeds United	Bradford
	Beagrie 74'	Report	Bridges 12', 62'	Stadium: Valley Parade; Attendance: 18,276; Referee: Paul Durkin

19 March 2000 29	Leeds United	4–1	Wimbledon	Leeds
	Bakke 23', 39'; Harte 28' (pen.); Kewell 83'	Report	Euell 2'	Stadium: Elland Road; Attendance: 39,256; Referee: Alan Wiley

26 March 2000 30	Leicester City	2–1	Leeds United	Leicester
	Collymore 14'; Guppy 46'	Report	Kewell 38'	Stadium: Filbert Street; Attendance: 21,095; Referee: Steve Lodge

1 April 2000 31	Leeds United	0–1	Chelsea	Leeds
		Report	Harley 62'	Stadium: Elland Road; Attendance: 40,162; Referee: Jeff Winter

9 April 2000 32	Aston Villa	1–0	Leeds United	Birmingham
	Joachim 39'	Report		Stadium: Villa Park; Attendance: 33,889; Referee: Barry Knight

16 April 2000 33	Leeds United	0–4	Arsenal	Leeds
		Report	Henry 21'; Keown 70'; Kanu 82'; Overmars 90'	Stadium: Elland Road; Attendance: 39,307; Referee: Steve Dunn

23 April 2000 34	Newcastle United	2–2	Leeds United	Newcastle
	Shearer 24', 48'	Report	Bridges 13'; Wilcox 17'	Stadium: St. James' Park; Attendance: 36,448; Referee: David Elleray

30 April 2000 35	Sheffield Wednesday	0–3	Leeds United	Sheffield
		Report	Hopkin 1'; Bridges 53'; Kewell 69'	Stadium: Hillsborough; Attendance: 23,416; Referee: Rob Harris

3 May 2000 36	Leeds United	3–1	Watford	Leeds
	Bridges 20'; Duberry 45'; Huckerby 52'	Report	Foley 32'	Stadium: Elland Road; Attendance: 36,324; Referee: Paul Alcock

8 May 2000 37	Leeds United	1–1	Everton	Leeds
	Bridges 30'	Report	Barmby 60'	Stadium: Elland Road; Attendance: 37,713; Referee: Andy D'Urso

14 May 2000 38	West Ham United	0–0	Leeds United	Newham
		Report		Stadium: Boleyn Ground; Attendance: 26,044; Referee: Graham Barber

=== FA Cup ===
12 December 1999 3	Leeds United	2–0	Port Vale	Leeds
	Bakke 61', 68'	Report		Stadium: Elland Road; Attendance: 11,912; Referee: Steve Dunn

9 January 2000 4	Manchester City	2–5	Leeds United	Manchester
	Goater 2'; Bishop 11'	Report	Bakke 8'; Smith 20'; Kewell 41', 88'; Bowyer 66'	Stadium: Maine Road; Attendance: 29,240; Referee: Dermot Gallagher

30 January 2000 5	Aston Villa	3–2	Leeds United	Birmingham
	Carbone 32', 58', 69'	Report	Harte 13'; Bakke 38'	Stadium: Villa Park; Attendance: 30,026; Referee: Graham Barber

=== League Cup ===
13 October 1999 3	Leeds United	1–0	Blackburn Rovers	Leeds
	Mills 90'	Report		Stadium: Elland Road; Attendance: 24,353; Referee: Jeff Winter

15 December 1999 4	Leicester City	0–0 (a.e.t.) (4–2 p)	Leeds United	Leicester
		Report		Stadium: Filbert Street; Attendance: 16,125; Referee: Graham Barber

=== UEFA Cup ===
==== First round ====
14 September 1999	Partizan Belgrade	1–3	Leeds United	Heerenveen
	Tomic 20'		Bowyer 26' 82'; Radebe 39'	Stadium: Abe Lenstra Stadion; Attendance: 4,950; Referee: Herbert Fandel (Germany)

30 September 1999	Leeds United	1–0	Partizan Belgrade	Leeds
	Huckerby 55'	Report		Stadium: Elland Road; Attendance: 39,806; Referee: Fritz Stuchlik (Austria)

==== Second round ====
21 October 1999	Leeds United	4–1	Lokomotiv Moscow	Leeds
	Bowyer 27' 45'; Smith 56'; Kewell 83'	Report	Loskov 81'	Stadium: Elland Road; Attendance: 37,814; Referee: Wolfgang Stark (Germany)

4 November 1999	Lokomotiv Moscow	0–3	Leeds United	Moscow
		Report	Harte 16'; Bridges 28' 45'	Stadium: Lokomotiv Stadium; Attendance: 8,000; Referee: Alain Sars (France)

==== Third round ====
2 December 1999	Spartak Moscow	2–1	Leeds United	Sofia
	Shirko 38'; Róbson 65'	Report	Kewell 14'	Stadium: Stadion Georgi Asparuhov; Attendance: 6,000; Referee: Anders Frisk (Sweden)

9 December 1999	Leeds United	1–0	Spartak Moscow	Leeds
	Radebe 84'	Report		Stadium: Elland Road; Attendance: 39,732; Referee: Antonio Jesús López Nieto (Spain)

==== Fourth round ====
2 March 2000	Roma	0–0	Leeds United	Rome
		Report		Stadium: Stadio Olimpico; Attendance: 37,726; Referee: Gilles Veissière (France)

9 March 2000	Leeds United	1–0	Roma	Leeds
	Kewell 67'	Report		Stadium: Elland Road; Attendance: 39,149; Referee: José María García-Aranda (Spain)

==== Quarter-finals ====
16 March 2000	Leeds United	3–0	Slavia Prague	Leeds
	Wilcox 39'; Kewell 54'; Bowyer 59'	Report		Stadium: Elland Road; Attendance: 39,519; Referee: Markus Merk (Germany)

23 March 2000	Slavia Prague	2–1	Leeds United	Prague
	Ulich 52', 79' (pen.)	Report	Kewell 47'	Stadium: Stadion Evžena Rošického; Attendance: 13,460; Referee: Oğuz Sarvan (Turkey)

==== Semi-finals ====
6 April 2000	Galatasaray	2–0	Leeds United	Istanbul
	Hakan Ş. 13'; Capone 44'	Report		Stadium: Ali Sami Yen Stadium; Attendance: 18,000; Referee: Hellmut Krug (Germany)

20 April 2000	Leeds United	2–2	Galatasaray	Leeds
	Bakke 16', 68'	Report	Hagi 5' (pen.); Hakan Ş. 42'	Stadium: Elland Road; Attendance: 38,306; Referee: Ľuboš Micheľ (Slovakia)

== Statistics ==
No.	Pos.	Name	League		FA Cup		League Cup		UEFA Cup		Total		Discipline	
No.	Pos.	Name	Apps	Goals	Apps	Goals	Apps	Goals	Apps	Goals	Apps	Goals	Yellow card	Red card
1	GK	(England) Nigel Martyn	38	0	3	0	2	0	12	0	55	0	2	0
2	DF	(Republic of Ireland) Gary Kelly	28+3	0	3	0	2	0	11	0	44+3	0	7	0
3	DF	(Republic of Ireland) Ian Harte	33	6	3	1	1	0	12	1	49	8	11	1
4	MF	(Norway) Alf-Inge Haaland	7+6	0	0	0	0	0	5+1	1	12+7	0	5	0
5	DF	(South Africa) Lucas Radebe	31	0	2	0	2	0	11	2	46	2	6	1
6	DF	(England) Jonathan Woodgate	32+2	1	3	0	2	0	10	0	47+2	1	1	0
7	MF	(Scotland) David Hopkin	10+4	1	0	0	1	0	2+1	0	13+5	1	1	0
8	FW	(England) Michael Bridges	32+2	19	1+1	0	2	0	12	2	47+3	21	9	0
10	FW	(Australia) Harry Kewell	36	10	3	2	2	0	12	5	53	17	7	1
11	MF	(England) Lee Bowyer	31+2	5	3	1	1	0	11	5	46+2	11	19	0
12	FW	(England) Darren Huckerby	9+24	2	3	0	0+1	0	1+8	1	11+35	3	0	0
14	MF	(Republic of Ireland) Stephen McPhail	23+1	2	0	0	1+1	0	9	0	36+2	2	0	0
16	MF	(England) Jason Wilcox	15+5	3	2	0	0	0	3+1	1	20+6	4	3	0
17	FW	(England) Alan Smith	20+6	4	2+1	1	1	0	2+6	1	25+13	6	10	1
18	DF	(England) Danny Mills	16+1	1	0+1	0	1	1	2	0	19+2	2	5	0
19	MF	(Norway) Eirik Bakke	24+5	2	3	4	2	0	9+1	2	38+6	8	7	0
20	MF	(Wales) Matt Jones	5+6	0	0+1	0	0+1	0	3+2	0	8+10	0	3	0
21	DF	(Austria) Martin Hiden	0+1	0	0	0	0	0	0	0	0+1	0	0	0
22	DF	(England) Michael Duberry	12+1	1	1	0	0+1	0	1	0	14+2	1	4	1
23	MF	(England) David Batty	16	0	0	0	2	0	4	0	22	0	4	0

== Transfers ==
=== In ===
Date	Pos.	Name	From	Fee
25 May 1999	MF	(Norway) Eirik Bakke	(Norway) Sogndal	£1,750,000
15 June 1999	DF	(England) Danny Mills	(England) Charlton Athletic	£4,000,000
9 July 1999	DF	(England) Michael Duberry	(England) Chelsea	£4,500,000
23 July 1999	FW	(England) Michael Bridges	(England) Sunderland	£5,000,000
11 August 1999	FW	(England) Darren Huckerby	(England) Coventry City	£4,000,000
19 August 1999	DF	(New Zealand) Danny Hay	(Australia) Perth Glory	£200,000
17 December 1999	MF	(England) Jason Wilcox	(England) Blackburn Rovers	£3,000,000
17 December 1999	GK	(Australia) Danny Milosevic	(Australia) Perth Glory	£110,000
5 March 2000	GK	(England) Shawn Allaway	(England) Reading	£300,000

=== Out ===
Date	Pos.	Name	To	Fee
11 June 1999	DF	(Norway) Gunnar Halle	(England) Bradford City	£200,000
15 June 1999	MF	(England) Lee Sharpe	(England) Bradford City	£200,000
18 June 1999	GK	(Portugal) Nuno Santos	(Portugal) Benfica	Free
30 June 1999	MF	(England) David Wetherall	(England) Bradford City	£1,400,000
16 July 1999	FW	(Netherlands) Clyde Wijnhard	(England) Huddersfield Town	£750,000
4 August 1999	FW	(Netherlands) Jimmy Floyd Hasselbaink	(Spain) Atlético Madrid	£12,000,000
6 August 1999	FW	(Scotland) Derek Lilley	(England) Oxford United	£75,000
1 October 1999	FW	(England) Paul Shepherd	(Scotland) Ayr United	Free
22 October 1999	MF	(Portugal) Bruno Ribeiro	(England) Sheffield United	£500,000
12 November 1999	DF	(England) Danny Granville	(England) Manchester City	£1,000,000
9 March 2000	MF	(England) Mark Jackson	(England) Scunthorpe United	Free
15 April 2000	FW	(England) Neil Ross	(England) Stockport County	Free
12 May 2000	MF	(Norway) Tommy Knarvik	(Norway) SK Brann	Free

=== Loan out ===
Date from	Date to	Pos.	Name	To
26 July 1999	12 November 1999	DF	(England) Danny Granville	(England) Manchester City
5 August 1999	5 September 1999	FW	(England) Kevin Dixon	(England) York City
14 January 2000	10 February 2000	DF	(England) Mark Jackson	(England) Barnsley
17 January 2000	6 May 2000	DF	(Wales) Kevin Evans	(Wales) Swansea City
23 March 2000	28 May 2000	FW	(England) Lee Matthews	(England) Gillingham
