= 1997–98 Leeds United A.F.C. season =

1997–98 season of Leeds United

Leeds United
1997–98 season
- Chairman: Bill Fotherby (until 23 June); Peter Ridsdale
- Manager: George Graham
- Stadium: Elland Road
- Premier League: 5th
- FA Cup: Quarter finals
- League Cup: Fourth round
- Top goalscorer: League: Jimmy Floyd Hasselbaink (16); All: Jimmy Floyd Hasselbaink (22)
- Highest home attendance: 39,952 vs Manchester United (27 September 1997, Premier League)
- Lowest home attendance: 8,806 vs Bristol City (17 September 1997, League Cup)
- Average home league attendance: 34,725

The 1997–98 season saw Leeds United competing in the Premier League (known as the FA Carling Premiership for sponsorship reasons) for a sixth successive season.

== Competitions ==
=== Premier League ===
==== League table ====
Pos	Team	Pld	W	D	L	GF	GA	GD	Pts	Qualification or relegation
3	Liverpool	38	18	11	9	68	42	+26	65	Qualification for the UEFA Cup first round
4	Chelsea	38	20	3	15	71	43	+28	63	Qualification for the Cup Winners' Cup first round (Note: Chelsea qualified for the Cup Winners' Cup as defending champions. As they were also the League Cup winners, the UEFA Cup berth vacated was awarded to Blackburn Rovers.)
5	Leeds United	38	17	8	13	57	46	+11	59	Qualification for the UEFA Cup first round (Note: Aston Villa was rewarded entry to the UEFA Cup through UEFA Fair Play ranking.)
6	Blackburn Rovers	38	16	10	12	57	52	+5	58	Qualification for the UEFA Cup first round
7	Aston Villa	38	17	6	15	49	48	+1	57	Qualification for the UEFA Cup first round

Source: Premier League
Rules for classification: 1) points; 2) goal difference; 3) number of goals scored.
Notes:

Results summary

Overall								Home						Away					
Pld	W	D	L	GF	GA	GD	Pts	W	D	L	GF	GA	GD	W	D	L	GF	GA	GD
38	17	8	13	57	46	+11	59	9	5	5	31	21	+10	8	3	8	26	25	+1

Source: 1997–98 FA Premier League table

Results by round

Round	1	2	3	4	5	6	7	8	9	10	11	12	13	14	15	16	17	18	19	20	21	22	23	24	25	26	27	28	29	30	31	32	33	34	35	36	37	38
Ground	H	A	H	H	A	A	H	A	H	A	H	A	A	H	H	A	H	A	H	A	H	A	H	A	A	A	H	H	H	A	A	H	H	A	A	H	A	H
Result	D	W	L	L	L	W	L	W	W	D	W	L	W	W	W	W	D	D	W	L	D	L	L	W	L	D	L	W	W	W	L	W	W	L	W	D	L	D
Position	9	5	9	11	14	9	14	8	6	7	6	8	7	4	4	4	5	4	4	5	5	6	7	7	7	8	8	7	7	5	5	4	4	5	4	5	5	5

Source: Statto.com
A = Away; H = Home; W = Win; D = Draw; L = Loss

=== Premier League ===
Date	Opponent	Venue	Result	Attendance	Scorers
9 August 1997	Arsenal	H	1–1	37,993	Hasselbaink
13 August 1997	Sheffield Wednesday	A	3–1	31,520	Wallace (2), Ribeiro
23 August 1997	Crystal Palace	H	0–2	29,076	
26 August 1997	Liverpool	H	0–2	39,775	
30 August 1997	Aston Villa	A	0–1	39,027	
14 September 1997	Blackburn Rovers	A	4–3	21,956	Wallace (2), Molenaar, Hopkin
20 September 1997	Leicester City	H	0–1	29,620	
24 September 1997	Southampton	A	2–0	15,102	Molenaar, Wallace
27 September 1997	Manchester United	H	1–0	39,952	Wetherall
4 October 1997	Coventry City	A	0–0	17,770	
18 October 1997	Newcastle United	H	4–1	39,834	Ribeiro, Kewell, Beresford (own goal), Wetherall
25 October 1997	Wimbledon	A	0–1	15,718	
1 November 1997	Tottenham Hotspur	A	1–0	26,441	Wallace
8 November 1997	Derby County	H	4–3	33,572	Wallace, Kewell, Hasselbaink (pen), Bowyer
23 November 1997	West Ham United	H	3–1	30,031	Hasselbaink (2), Haaland
29 November 1997	Barnsley	A	3–2	18,690	Haaland, Wallace, Lilley
6 December 1997	Everton	H	0–0	34,869	
13 December 1997	Chelsea	A	0–0	34,690	
20 December 1997	Bolton Wanderers	H	2–0	31,163	Ribeiro, Hasselbaink
26 December 1997	Liverpool	A	1–3	43,854	Haaland
28 December 1997	Aston Villa	H	1–1	36,287	Hasselbaink
10 January 1998	Arsenal	A	1–2	38,018	Hasselbaink
17 January 1998	Sheffield Wednesday	H	1–2	33,166	Pembridge (own goal)
31 January 1998	Crystal Palace	A	2–0	25,248	Wallace, Hasselbaink
7 February 1998	Leicester City	A	0–1	21,244	
22 February 1998	Newcastle United	A	1–1	36,511	Wallace
28 February 1998	Southampton	H	0–1	28,791	
4 March 1998	Tottenham Hotspur	H	1–0	31,394	Kewell
11 March 1998	Blackburn Rovers	H	4–0	32,933	Bowyer, Hasselbaink, Haaland (2)
15 March 1998	Derby County	A	5–0	30,217	Laursen (own goal), Halle, Bowyer, Kewell, Hasselbaink
30 March 1998	West Ham United	A	0–3	24,107	
4 April 1998	Barnsley	H	2–1	37,749	Hasselbaink, Moses (own goal)
8 April 1998	Chelsea	H	3–1	37,276	Hasselbaink (2), Wetherall
11 April 1998	Everton	A	0–2	37,099	
18 April 1998	Bolton Wanderers	A	3–2	25,000	Haaland, Halle, Hasselbaink
25 April 1998	Coventry City	H	3–3	36,522	Hasselbaink (2), Kewell
4 May 1998	Manchester United	A	0–3	55,167	
10 May 1998	Wimbledon	H	1–1	38,172	Haaland

=== FA Cup ===
Round	Date	Opponent	Venue	Result	Attendance	Goalscorers
Round Three	3 January 1998	Oxford United	H	4–0	20,568	Radebe, Hasselbaink (pen), Kewell (2)
Round Four	24 January 1998	Grimsby Town	H	2–0	29,598	Molenaar, Hasselbaink
Round Five	14 February 1998	Birmingham City	H	3–2	35,463	Wallace, Hasselbaink (2)
Quarter-Final	7 March 1998	Wolverhampton Wanderers	H	0–1	39,902	

=== League Cup ===
Round	Date	Opponent	Venue	Result	Attendance	Goalscorers
Round Two First-Leg	17 September 1997	Bristol City	H	3–1	8,806	Wetherall, Hasselbaink (pen), Ribeiro
Round Two Second-Leg	30 September 1997	Bristol City	A	1–2 (won 4–3 on agg)	10,857	Hasselbaink
Round Three	15 October 1997	Stoke City	A	3–1 (a.e.t.)	16,203	Kewell, Wallace (2)
Round Four	18 November 1997	Reading	H	2–3	15,069	Wetherall, Bowyer

== Statistics ==
No.	Pos.	Name	League		FA Cup		League Cup		Total		Discipline	
No.	Pos.	Name	Apps	Goals	Apps	Goals	Apps	Goals	Apps	Goals	Yellow card	Red card
1	GK	(England) Nigel Martyn	37	0	4	0	4	0	45	0	0	0
2	DF	(Republic of Ireland) Gary Kelly	34	0	3+1	0	3	0	40+1	0	7	1
3	DF	(Scotland) David Robertson	24+2	0	1	0	4	0	29+2	0	6	0
4	DF	(Norway) Alf-Inge Haaland	26+6	7	2	0	3	0	31+6	0	7	1
5	DF	(South Africa) Lucas Radebe	26+1	0	2	1	4	0	32+1	1	10	1
6	DF	(England) David Wetherall	33+1	3	3	0	4	2	40+1	0	7	0
8	FW	(England) Rod Wallace	29+2	10	4	1	4	2	37+2	13	6	0
9	FW	(Netherlands) Jimmy Floyd Hasselbaink	30+3	16	4	4	3	2	37+3	22	4	0
10	MF	(Portugal) Bruno Ribeiro	28+1	3	3	0	2+1	1	33+2	4	5	0
11	MF	(England) Lee Bowyer	21+4	3	3	0	2+1	1	26+5	4	5	0
12	MF	(Scotland) David Hopkin	22+3	1	1	0	4	0	27+3	0	4	0
17	FW	(Scotland) Derek Lilley	0+12	1	0+1	0	0+4	0	0+16	1	0	0
18	DF	(Norway) Gunnar Halle	31+2	2	3	0	2+1	0	36+3	2	5	1
19	FW	(Australia) Harry Kewell	26+3	5	4	2	2	1	32+3	8	2	1
20	DF	(Republic of Ireland) Ian Harte	12	0	1+2	0	0	0	13+2	0	0	0
21	DF	(Austria) Martin Hiden	11	0	1	0	0	0	12	0	2	0
27	DF	(Republic of Ireland) Alan Maybury	9+3	0	2	0	1	0	12+3	0	3	0
29	DF	(England) Mark Jackson	0+1	0	0	0	0	0	0+1	0	0	0
30	DF	(Netherlands) Robert Molenaar	18+4	2	3	1	2+1	0	23+5	3	4	0
35	FW	(England) Lee Matthews	0+3	0	0	0	0	0	0+3	0	0	0
37	MF	(Republic of Ireland) Stephen McPhail	0+4	0	0	0	0	0	0+4	0	0	0

== Transfers ==
=== In ===
Date	Pos.	Name	From	Fee
12 June 1997	FW	(Netherlands) Jimmy Floyd Hasselbaink	(Portugal) Boavista	£2,000,000
12 June 1997	DF	(Norway) Alf-Inge Haaland	(England) Nottingham Forest	£1,600,000
18 June 1997	MF	(Portugal) Bruno Ribeiro	(Portugal) Vitória	£500,000
21 July 1997	MF	(Scotland) David Hopkin	(England) Crystal Palace	£3,250,000
25 February 1998	DF	(Austria) Martin Hiden	(Austria) Rapid Vienna	£1,300,000
16 May 1998	FW	(Netherlands) Clyde Wijnhard	(Netherlands) Willem II	£1,500,000

=== Out ===
Date	Pos.	Name	To	Fee
1 June 1997	GK	(South Africa) Paul Evans	Released	
1 August 1997	MF	(England) Mark Ford	(England) Burnley	£250,000
1 August 1997	FW	(England) Brian Deane	(England) Sheffield United	£1,500,000
1 August 1997	MF	(England) Andy Couzens	(England) Carlisle United	£100,000
18 August 1997	FW	(Wales) Ian Rush	(England) Newcastle United	Free
20 August 1997	DF	(England) Tony Dorigo	(Italy) Torino	Free
23 September 1997	DF	(England) Carlton Palmer	(England) Southampton	£1,300,000
23 September 1997	FW	(Ghana) Tony Yeboah	(Germany) Hamburger SV	£1,000,000
5 January 1998	FW	(France) Pierre Laurent	(France) Bastia	£500,000
5 January 1998	FW	(England) Richard Jobson	(England) Manchester City	Free

=== Loan out ===
Date from	Date to	Pos.	Name	To
11 December 1997	1 June 1998	FW	(Scotland) Andy Gray	(England) Bury
21 January 1998	1 March 1998	DF	(England) Richard Jobson	(England) Southend United
31 March 1998	31 May 1998	MF	(England) Jason Blunt	(Scotland) Raith Rovers
