= Smithard =

Smithard is a surname. Notable people with the surname include:

- Ben Smithard, British cinematographer
- Matthew Smithard (born 1976), an English professional footballer

== See also ==
- Smith (surname)
