= Steven Hawes =

Steven Hawes may refer to:

- Stephen Hawes (died 1523), English poet
- Steve Hawes (born 1950), American basketball player

== See also ==
- Steven Hawe (born 1980), Northern Irish footballer
