= Adam Eaton =

Adam Eaton may refer to:

- Adam Eaton (pitcher) (born 1977), American baseball pitcher
- Adam Eaton (outfielder) (born 1988), American baseball outfielder
- Adam Eaton (footballer) (born 1980), English footballer
