= Bertie Brayley =

English footballer (born 1981)

Personal information
- Full name: Albert Brayley
- Date of birth: 5 September 1981 (age 45)
- Place of birth: Basildon, England
- Height: 1.78 m (5 ft 10 in)
- Positions: Midfielder; striker

Youth career
- Wimbledon
- Aston Villa
- West Ham United

Senior career*
Years	Team	Apps	(Gls)
1999–2000	West Ham United	0	(0)
2000–2001	Queens Park Rangers	0	(0)
2001–2002	Swindon Town	7	(0)
2002–2004	Canvey Island	34	(8)
2003	→ Heybridge Swifts (loan)	12	(10)
2004	Hornchurch	16	(2)
2004	→ Braintree Town (loan)	8	(4)
2004	→ Billericay Town (loan)	5	(2)
2004–2005	Heybridge Swifts	9	(3)
2005	Farnborough Town	4	(0)
2005	Thurrock	7	(2)
2005	Aldershot Town	5	(0)
2005	Grays Athletic	4	(0)
2005–2006	Margate	25	(5)
2006	Eastleigh	2	(0)
2006–2007	Braintree Town	19	(3)
2007–2009	Chelmsford City	70	(21)
2009	Eastleigh	4	(0)
2009	Chelmsford City	1	(0)
2009	Bishop's Stortford		
2009–2010	Bishop's Stortford	21	(1)
2010	Braintree Town		
2010	Concord Rangers		
2010–2011	Billericay Town		
2011	Harlow Town	6	(3)
2011	Heybridge Swifts		
2011	Thurrock		(0)
2011–2012	Tooting & Mitcham United		
2012	Harlow Town		
2012	Bishop's Stortford		
2012	→ East Thurrock United (loan)	1	(0)
2012–2013	Harlow Town	3	(0)
2013	Basildon United		
2013–2014	Chelmsford City	13	(3)
2013–2014	→ Enfield Town (loan)	5	(2)
2014	Great Wakering Rovers	5	(1)
2014	→ VCD Athletic (loan)	3	(1)
2014–2015	Burnham Ramblers	27	(0)
2015	Concord Rangers	10	(0)
2016	Dorking Wanderers	9	(2)
2016	Canvey Island	1	(0)
2019	Hullbridge Sports	4	(0)
2021–2022	Basildon United	12	(2)

International career
2006	England learning disabilities		

Managerial career
- 2013: Basildon United
- 2014–2015: Burnham Ramblers
- * Club domestic league appearances and goals as of 19:25, 5 November 2016 (UTC)

Albert Brayley (born 5 September 1981) is an English former footballer who played as a striker. Brayley played in the Football League with Swindon Town in the 2001–02 season before dropping into non-League football.

== Club career ==
Brayley began his footballing career at Wimbledon, before moving to Aston Villa as a schoolboy. After finding the travel from Basildon to Birmingham to play for Aston Villa a challenge, Brayley joined West Ham United, the club he supported.

At West Ham, Brayley was a member of their FA Youth Cup winning squad in 1999, scoring three goals in a 9–0 aggregate win over Coventry City. He signed professional forms in August 1999 but was released by the club without making any first team appearances.

Brayley joined Football League Second Division side Queens Park Rangers but after the club was relegated and went into administration, he was released along with 15 other players in May 2001, having made no appearances for the club. He joined Football League Second Division side Swindon Town in August 2001, where he made seven substitute appearances in the league and three in other competitions, in the 2001–02 season.

He left Swindon in August 2002 and after failing to impress on trial with Brentford, he dropped into non-league football, joining Canvey Island. Further moves include Hornchurch, Billericay Town, Heybridge Swifts, Farnborough Town, Thurrock, Aldershot Town, Grays Athletic, Margate in December 2005, Eastleigh in September 2006, Braintree Town in November 2006, Chelmsford City in summer 2007, Eastleigh for the second time in February 2009, Chelmsford City for the second time in March 2009, before joining fellow Conference South side Bishop's Stortford in late August 2009. He left the club in October, but returned for a second spell at Christmas time until February 2010. The remainder of the season he spent with Braintree Town. He then signed for Concord Rangers in the summer of 2010, and after being released from them he signed for Billericay Town in October 2010. In February 2011 he joined Harlow Town, Heybridge Swifts in August 2011, Thurrock in October 2011, Tooting & Mitcham United in December 2011, Harlow Town in March 2012, Bishop's Stortford again in August 2012, and East Thurrock United on dual registration in November 2012. In early 2013, he became the player-manager of non-league and hometown side Basildon United.

In July 2013 Brayley was offered a short-term contract at Chelmsford City, his third spell at the club.

On 27 March 2014, he made his debut for Great Wakering Rovers. Subsequently, he joined VCD Athletic on dual registration, making his debut for them on 12 April 2014.

He returned to Canvey Island in October 2016.

On 30 August 2019, Brayley joined Hullbridge Sports.

In September 2021, Brayley re-signed for Basildon United.

== Managerial career ==
In 2013, Brayley was named as manager of his hometown club Basildon United whilst still playing for them. In August 2014, Brayley was appointed manager of Burnham Ramblers, again in a player-manager role, however he resigned from his post at Burnham Ramblers after the club were relegated from the Isthmian League Division One North in March 2015.

== Honours ==
West Ham United

- FA Youth Cup: 1999

Chelmsford City

- Isthmian League: 2007–08
- Essex Senior Cup: 2009
