= Richard Harris (footballer) =

English footballer (born 1980)

Personal information
- Date of birth: 23 October 1980 (age 46)
- Place of birth: Croydon, England
- Position: Striker

Youth career
- 1988–1998: Crystal Palace

Senior career*
Years	Team	Apps	(Gls)
1998–2002	Crystal Palace	8	(0)
2001	→ Mansfield Town (loan)	6	(0)
2002	→ Wycombe Wanderers (loan)	3	(0)
2002–2004	Wycombe Wanderers	32	(5)
2003–2004	→ Woking (loan)	7	(2)
2004	Eastbourne Borough	10	(2)
Total		66	(9)
- * Club domestic league appearances and goals

Richard Harris (born 23 October 1980) is an English former professional footballer who played in the Football League for Crystal Palace and Wycombe Wanderers during the late 1990s and early 2000s. He made an appearance in the FA Youth Cup final against Leeds United in the 1996–97 season against players like Paul Robinson, Harry Kewell and Alan Smith.

== Career ==
Born in Croydon, Harris joined Crystal Palace as a seven-year-old and progressed through the youth and reserve teams to the first team, for whom he made his debut against Huddersfield Town in May 1999. He made 13 league and cup appearances for Crystal Palace, and had loan spells at Mansfield Town and Wycombe Wanderers, before joining Wycombe Wanderers on a permanent basis in April 2002. Harris scored eight goals in 39 appearances in all competitions for Wycombe Wanderers, including two goals in a League Cup victory over First Division side Wimbledon in August 2003. He joined non-league side Woking in December 2003, and later Maidenhead United, before being released by Wycombe Wanderers at the end of the 2003–04 season. He then dropped into non-league football with spells at Eastbourne Borough, Maidenhead United, Horsham, Merthyr Tydfil, Llanelli, Sutton United, and Tonbridge Angels.

== See also ==
- FA Youth Cup Finals of the 1990s
