= David Hilton (footballer) =

English footballer

Personal information
- Full name: David Hilton
- Date of birth: 9 October 1977 (age 49)
- Place of birth: Barnsley, England
- Height: 5 ft 10 in (1.78 m)
- Position: Left wing

Youth career
- 1994–1995: Manchester United

Senior career*
Years	Team	Apps	(Gls)
1995–1997	Manchester United	0	(0)
1997–1998	Darlington	1	(0)
1998	Ayr United	0	(0)
- * Club domestic league appearances and goals

David Hilton (born 9 October 1977) is an English former footballer who played in the Football League for Darlington. He played as a left back or on the left wing.

== Career ==
Hilton was a schoolboy international; in June 1993, the Independent's Henry Winter reported that "the chase [was] on to sign David Hilton, a left-sided boy with a healthy appetite for raiding down the wing". The chase was won by Manchester United, for whom Hilton had signed schoolboy forms by the time he appeared for England under-16s the following February.

Hilton was a substitute in the second leg of the 1995 FA Youth Cup Final, won by Manchester United on penalties. He turned professional with the club, but never appeared for the first team. Towards the end of the 1996–97 season, with his contract due to expire, Hilton had a trial at Burnley, where he impressed manager Adrian Heath, but no contract ensued. He joined Darlington on a monthly contract at the start of the 1997–98 Football League season and appeared once, on 30 August as a late substitute in a 1–1 draw with Rotherham United in Division Three. In early 1998, Hilton joined Scottish First Division club Ayr United on trial, on the recommendation of Manchester United manager Alex Ferguson. He signed for them in March, but never played for the first team.
