= Ross Darcy =

Irish footballer

Personal information
- Date of birth: 21 March 1978 (age 46)
- Place of birth: Balbriggan, Ireland
- Position(s): Defender

Senior career*
Years	Team	Apps	(Gls)
-1999	Tottenham Hotspur	0	(0)
1999–2002	Barnet	6	(0)
2000–2001	→ Dover Athletic (loan)	5	(0)
2002–2004	Dundalk		
- *Club domestic league appearances and goals

Ross Darcy (born 21 March 1978) is an Irish retired footballer.

== Career ==
As a youth player, Darcy chose to join English top flight side Tottenham Hotspur over the most successful club in England, Manchester United. After helping Tottenham Hotspur win the FA Youth Cup, Darcy joined the first team but injuries kept him from making an appearance and he left for Barnet in the English fourth division.

After returning to the Republic of Ireland with Dundalk, he retired due to injury.
