= Gary Kelly (footballer, born 1974) =

Irish footballer

Personal information
- Full name: Gary Oliver Kelly
- Date of birth: 9 July 1974 (age 52)
- Place of birth: Drogheda, Ireland
- Position: Right-back

Youth career
- 1989–1990: Drogheda United
- 1990–1991: Home Farm
- 1991–1992: Leeds United

Senior career*
Years	Team	Apps	(Gls)
1992–2007	Leeds United	531	(7)

International career
1992–1994	Republic of Ireland U21	5	(0)
1994–2003	Republic of Ireland	52	(2)
- * Club domestic league appearances and goals

Gary Oliver Kelly (born 9 July 1974) is an Irish former footballer who played his entire professional career with Leeds United.

Kelly played as a right-back or a right midfielder from 1992 until 2007 and made 531 appearances in total for Leeds United, being the only player to make more than 500 appearances outside the stewardship of Don Revie.

== Club career ==
Kelly, the youngest of a family of 13, originally started playing football as a striker, and was reasonably successful in this position for Home Farm. However, when he joined Leeds, then boss Howard Wilkinson recognised qualities in him that would make a very good wing-back.

Kelly made his debut for Leeds in the 1991–92 season, although he did not become a regular in the side until the 1993–94 season, when Wilkinson made him his first choice right-back following the injury-induced retirement of Mel Sterland, occasionally filing in at centre back when needed.

He had played just twice in the 1991–92 season, when Leeds were champions of the last old Football League First Division before the FA Premier League was created, and did not qualify for a title winner's medal.

He was selected in the Premier League team of the season for the 1993–94 campaign. By the end of that season, he had also played himself into Jack Charlton's Republic of Ireland squad that went to the 1994 World Cup in the USA. Kelly was one of the "Three Amigos" alongside Phil Babb and Jason McAteer whose youthful exuberance rejuvenated an ageing Irish squad. Kelly scored in a 2–0 victory over Germany in a warm-up friendly before those finals. Kelly was installed by George Graham as his skipper in the 1997–98 season, at the age of 23.

Kelly was generally a regular either at right back or right midfield in every subsequent season he played for Leeds, except for 1998–99, when shin splints ruined his season (this injury would reoccur in subsequent seasons). But Kelly forced his way back into the Leeds first team, in 1999–2000, making the right back role his own, despite the signing of Danny Mills in the summer of 1999. Kelly once again took over as skipper when Lucas Radebe was on international duty. He was rewarded with a testimonial match in May 2002, played against Celtic. The proceeds from this match were donated to several cancer charities chosen by Kelly (mainly Teenage Cancer Charity in Leeds and Cancer Support Centre in Drogheda), in dedication to his sister, Mandy, who died from the disease in 1998 aged only 35. Seen by a crowd of 26,440, Celtic won this match, which generated nearly £1 million in receipts – making up the majority of the total £1.5 million which was raised to open a cancer centre in his native Drogheda. He is also only the 10th player to ever make over 500 appearances for Leeds United, making the feat against Luton Town in Leeds' 2–1 victory at Elland Road on 25 February 2006.

Kelly played regularly in the first half of his 16th season at Leeds. But at that stage, he had fallen out with Ken Bates and new Leeds manager, Dennis Wise. On 26 October 2006, Wise revealed Shaun Derry was replacing Kelly as the new Leeds vice captain.

After 16 years of loyal service to the club, a presentation of a crystal cut vase was made to Kelly at the last home game of the 2006–07 season by former Leeds United players Paul Reaney, Allan Clarke, Mick Jones, and Frank Worthington.

== International career ==
Kelly scored three goals in the 1992 UEFA European Under-18 Football Championship qualifiers and won 52 international caps playing for the Republic of Ireland scoring two goals, before his retirement from international football. He represented them at both the 1994 FIFA World Cup and 2002 FIFA World Cup.

== Personal life ==
Kelly is the uncle of fellow Irish international and Leeds teammate Ian Harte. Kelly and Harte were both part of Ireland's 2002 World Cup squad. Kelly was also regarded amongst the Leeds squad as being a prankster and joker, having pulled several different stunts, including wearing Nicky Byrne of Westlife's clothes for a training session when Byrne had got changed to join in with the training session. Byrne used to be part of the youth team set up at Leeds United during the mid-1990s, and is a friend of Kelly.

== Career statistics ==
=== Club ===
Appearances and goals by club, season and competition
Club	Season	League			FA Cup		League Cup		Europe		Other		Total	
Club	Season	Division	Apps	Goals	Apps	Goals	Apps	Goals	Apps	Goals	Apps	Goals	Apps	Goals
Leeds United	1991–92	First Division	2	0	0	0	1	0	—		0	0	3	0
Leeds United	1992–93	Premier League	0	0	0	0	0	0	0	0	0	0	0	0
Leeds United	1993–94	Premier League	42	0	3	0	2	0	—		0	0	47	0
Leeds United	1994–95	Premier League	42	0	4	0	2	0	—		0	0	48	0
Leeds United	1995–96	Premier League	34	0	5	0	8	0	4 (Note: Appearances in UEFA Cup)	0	0	0	51	0
Leeds United	1996–97	Premier League	36	2	4	0	3	0	—		0	0	43	2
Leeds United	1997–98	Premier League	34	0	4	0	3	0	—		0	0	41	0
Leeds United	1998–99	Premier League	0	0	0	0	0	0	0	0	0	0	0	0
Leeds United	1999–2000	Premier League	31	0	3	0	2	0	11	0	0	0	47	0
Leeds United	2000–01	Premier League	24	0	1	0	1	0	12 (Note: Appearances in UEFA Champions League)	0	0	0	38	0
Leeds United	2001–02	Premier League	20	0	1	0	1	0	3	0	0	0	25	0
Leeds United	2002–03	Premier League	25	0	4	1	0	0	6	0	0	0	35	1
Leeds United	2003–04	Premier League	38	0	0	0	2	0	—		0	0	40	0
Leeds United	2004–05	Championship	43	0	1	0	3	0	—		0	0	47	0
Leeds United	2005–06	Championship	44	0	2	1	0	0	—		3 (Note: Appearances in Championship play-offs)	0	49	1
Leeds United	2006–07	Championship	16	0	0	0	2	0	—		0	0	18	0
Total			431	2	32	2	30	0	36	0	3	0	532	4

=== International ===
Scores and results list Ireland's goal tally first, score column indicates score after each Kelly goal.

List of international goals scored by Gary Kelly
No.	Date	Venue	Opponent	Score	Result	Competition
1	29 May 1994	HDI-Arena, Hanover, Germany	Germany	2–0	2–0	Friendly
2	24 March 2001	GSP Stadium, Nicosia, Cyprus	Cyprus	3–0	4–0	2002 World Cup qualification

== Honours ==
Leeds United

- Football League Cup runner-up: 1995–96

Individual

- PFA Team of the Year: 1993–94 Premier League, 1999–2000 Premier League, 2005–06 Football League Championship

== See also ==
- One-club man
