= Scott Gardner =

English footballer

Personal information
- Full name: Scott Andrew Gardner
- Date of birth: 1 April 1988 (age 38)
- Place of birth: Luxembourg
- Position: Defender

Team information
- Current team: Leeds United (under 21's manager)

Youth career
- –2006: Leeds United

Senior career*
Years	Team	Apps	(Gls)
2006–2009	Leeds United	1	(0)
2008	→ Farsley Celtic (loan)	3	(0)
2008	→ Farsley Celtic (loan)	3	(0)
2009–2010	Mansfield Town	12	(0)
2010	→ Eastwood Town (loan)	7	(0)

International career^{‡}
2003	England U16	1	(0)
2004	England U17		
- * Club domestic league appearances and goals as of 7 January 2010 ‡ National team caps and goals as of 19 November 2008

Scott Andrew Gardner (born 1 April 1988) is an English former footballer and current coach of Leeds United's under-21s. He most recently played for Conference National side Mansfield Town, where he played as a defender.

He has previously played for England at under-16 and under-17 level.

== Playing career ==
=== Leeds United ===
A product of the Leeds United academy, Gardner signed his first professional contract with the club in 2006, then later penned a one-year extension on 19 June 2007. Previously a regular in the Leeds United reserve side, Gardner was involved with the first-team during the 2007–08 pre-season, including playing in a home friendly against Wigan Athletic. Although naturally a right-winger, Gardner played as a right-back during his time at Elland Road.

He made his full debut for Leeds on 14 August 2007 in a 1–0 win against Macclesfield Town in the League Cup.

=== Farsley Celtic (loan) ===
On 22 January 2008, Gardner signed a one-month loan deal with Conference National side Farsley Celtic, who are also based in Leeds. Gardner returned from his loan spell in late February 2008. He made an impressive league debut for Leeds in the 2–1 win over Gillingham in May, a game which relegated the Gills.

=== Farsley Celtic (2nd loan) ===
On 19 September 2008, Gardner re-joined Farsley Celtic, now in the Conference North, on a one-month loan, playing in three games.

=== Mansfield Town ===
On 30 January 2009, Gardner's contract at Leeds United was terminated by mutual consent. Three days later, on 2 February 2009, Gardner signed for Conference National club Mansfield Town until the end of the 2008–09 season along with defender Gianluca Havern. On 16 March 2009, Gardner signed an extension to his Mansfield contract, keeping him at the club until the end of the 2009–10 season.

== Coaching career ==
He currently coaches Leeds United's under-21 Team, having formally been a coach of the team's U18 side. He was promoted to the U21 team first on a temporary basis when Michael Skubala was hired by Lincoln City in November 2023. Gardner was given the U21 managerial role full time with former England international Stewart Downing joining as assistant manager in January 2024.
