= David Poppleton =

English footballer

Personal information
- Full name: David John Poppleton
- Date of birth: 19 December 1979 (age 45)
- Place of birth: Doncaster, England
- Position: Midfielder

Senior career*
Years	Team	Apps	(Gls)
1997-1999	Everton	0	(0)
1999–2000	Lincoln City	5	(0)
- * Club domestic league appearances and goals

David John Poppleton (born 19 December 1979) is an English former footballer.

== Career ==
After winning the FA Youth Cup with Everton, Poppleton signed for Lincoln City in the Football League Third Division to get more game time. However, he soon sustained an injury and retired from professional football at the end of 1999–2000 because he was "disillusioned with football".
