= Andy Gray (footballer, born 1977) =

Scotland international footballer

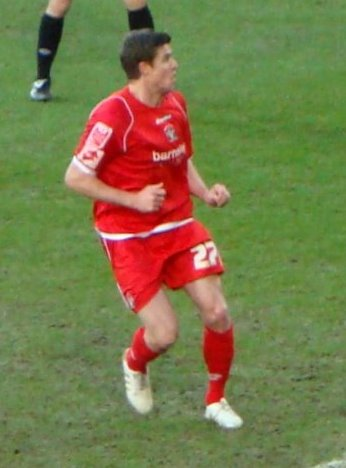
- Gray playing for Barnsley

Personal information
- Full name: Andrew David Gray
- Date of birth: 15 November 1977 (age 49)
- Place of birth: Harrogate, England
- Height: 6 ft 1 in (1.85 m)
- Positions: Striker; winger

Youth career
- –1995: Leeds United

Senior career*
Years	Team	Apps	(Gls)
1995–1998	Leeds United	22	(0)
1997–1998	→ Bury (loan)	6	(1)
1998–2002	Nottingham Forest	64	(1)
1999	→ Preston North End (loan)	5	(0)
1999	→ Oldham Athletic (loan)	4	(0)
2002–2004	Bradford City	77	(20)
2004–2005	Sheffield United	58	(25)
2005–2006	Sunderland	21	(1)
2006	→ Burnley (loan)	9	(3)
2006–2008	Burnley	60	(25)
2008	→ Charlton Athletic (loan)	1	(0)
2008–2009	Charlton Athletic	44	(9)
2009–2012	Barnsley	96	(21)
2012–2013	Leeds United	8	(1)
2013–2014	Bradford City	15	(1)
Total		490	(108)

International career
2003	Scotland	2	(0)
- * Club domestic league appearances and goals

Andrew David Gray (born 15 November 1977) is a former professional footballer.

Andy Gray started his career as a midfield player but later moved into a forward position. Gray began his career with Leeds United and he later played for Nottingham Forest, Charlton Athletic, Bury, Preston North End, Oldham Athletic, Barnsley, Bradford City, Sheffield United, Sunderland and Burnley. He also won two caps for Scotland, against Lithuania and New Zealand in 2003.

== Career ==
=== Leeds United ===
Gray was born in Harrogate, North Yorkshire. He signed for Leeds United which carried on the family tradition of his father Frank Gray and his uncle Eddie Gray. One of Gray's first senior appearances came for Leeds United in the 1996 League Cup final, when he was 18 years old. Leeds lost 3–0 to Aston Villa.

After failing to displace the likes of Tony Yeboah, Rod Wallace, Brian Deane and then Jimmy Floyd Hasselbaink, Gray had a loan spell at Bury to get regular first team football before leaving the club permanently in 1998.

=== Nottingham Forest ===
Gray joined fellow Premier League side Nottingham Forest on a permanent deal. Signed as a winger, Gray endured a frustrating time at the City Ground where he was deployed at full back for a portion of his time there. He managed to net his only goal for the club in a game against Wolverhampton Wanderers, in 64 appearances. He also had loan spells at Preston North End and Oldham Athletic.

=== Bradford City ===
Gray left Forest for a spell at Bradford City where he converted to the role of striker. He earned the Bradford City Player of the year Award in 2003. His form at Bradford earned him a call up to the Scotland national team. In total Gray scored 20 league goals in 77 games for Bradford.

=== Sheffield United ===
His form at Bradford also alerted Neil Warnock who signed Gray for Sheffield United. One of the highlights of Gray's career came when he scored a last minute equaliser against Arsenal in the FA Cup in 2005. After scoring 25 goals in 58 games for United, Gray joined Sunderland in the Premier League in a multimillion-pound deal.

=== Sunderland ===
In August 2005, Gray returned to the Premier League after he signed for Sunderland. He had a goal-scoring record of 28 goals in 65 games at Sheffield United, prompting the £1.1 million transfer to the Black Cats. However, his second stint in the Premier League was unprofitable as he scored only once in 22 appearances; that goal coming on his debut against Charlton Athletic.

=== Burnley ===
On 17 March 2006, after prolonged interest from a number of clubs, he signed on loan for Burnley until the end of the season, after he was placed on the transfer list by manager Niall Quinn. His former club Leeds United were favourites to sign him but his switch to Burnley became permanent when the transfer window reopened in the summer of 2006 for around £750,000. His early form at Burnley at the end of the 2005–06 season and the start of the next suggested that he would again prove an effective goalscorer in the Championship. His 2006–07 season was disrupted by a broken metatarsal, incurred against Leeds United, but both before and after the injury he scored regularly. Burnley's long winless run that season coincided with Gray's absence through injury, demonstrating his importance to the team as a source of goals. He returned towards the end of the 2006–07 season, scoring four goals in three games as Burnley won five of their last six games. This goal-scoring form continued into the 2007–08 season.

=== Charlton Athletic ===
Gray left Burnley on 18 January 2008, when he sealed an emergency loan deal with Charlton Athletic prior to a permanent move the following week. He made his debut when came on as a second-half substitute the following day in Charlton's 1–1 draw away at Watford. His £1.5 million move to Charlton was finalised the following week and he made his first start for his new club on 29 January 2008 in a 1–0 victory over Stoke City. His first goal for Charlton came in his 13th game, when he scored an equaliser in a 1–1 draw with Southampton on 12 April 2008. Gray followed this up with goals in successive home games with the second goal against Coventry City in a 4–1 win, a goal against Swindon in a 1–1 draw and a penalty in the impressive 4–2 defeat of newly relegated Reading.

=== Barnsley ===
Gray signed for Championship side Barnsley on 21 August 2009 for an undisclosed fee and made his debut the following day at Leicester City. Gray scored his first goal in 3–1 loss to Reading on 28 August 2009. Gray was part of a Barnsley side that beat Yorkshire rivals Leeds United 5–2 in a famous victory. Gray scored a double against Leicester City on 13 January 2012 to help earn Barnsley a win.

After scoring 21 goals in 96 games for Barnsley, he was released at the end of the 2011–2012 season following three years with the club.

=== Return to Leeds United ===
After being linked with a move to Bradford City, Leeds United manager Neil Warnock stated that Gray had started pre-season training with the club and that they were looking to sign the striker on a short-term contract, to cover for injured striker Davide Somma. On 20 July, Gray scored two goals in a 5–2 win for Leeds United in pre-season against Farsley.

On 23 July, Gray rejoined his first club Leeds on a one-year contract, 15 years after leaving the club previously. Gray was allocated the number 18 shirt for the 2012–13 season on 3 August Gray made his second Leeds début as a substitute in the 2–1 victory over Peterborough United on 25 August. Gray made his first start back at the club on 28 August 2012 in a League Cup match against Oxford United. Gray scored his first ever goal for Leeds United in a 3–2 defeat to Hull City on 18 September.

=== Return to Bradford City ===
After being released by Leeds United on 9 January 2013, Andy Gray rejoined his old club Bradford City on an 18-month contract. He made his debut on 12 January, when he started in the home game against Oxford United where they lost 1–2. On 21 December he scored his first goal since re-joining the club in a 2–1 defeat against Peterborough United.

On 1 May 2014, Gray had his contract cancelled by mutual consent and left the Bantams with immediate effect.

== Coaching career ==
On 30 July 2015, Gray re-joined Leeds United as the Under 16s academy coach.

On 24 June 2016, Gray was promoted to co-Under 18s manager at Leeds alongside Mark Jackson as part of Leeds' academy structure. Jackson would manage the Under 18s solely for the 2017–18 season.

== International career ==
Born and raised in England, Gray represented Scotland at international level like his father Frank Gray and uncle Eddie Gray. He received his first caps from Berti Vogts. In total Gray won two caps for Scotland, with his debut coming against Lithuania on 2 April 2003 and his second and final cap was against New Zealand on 27 May 2003.

== Personal life ==
Andy is the son of the former Scotland defender Frank Gray and nephew of Leeds United legend Eddie Gray. His cousin Stuart Gray was also a pro footballer. His eldest son Archie is a professional footballer at Tottenham Hotspur, while his younger son Harry Gray plays for Sheffield Wednesday on loan from Leeds United.

== Career statistics ==
As of match played 25 March 2014.

Appearances and goals by club, season and competition
Club	Season	League			FA Cup		League Cup		Other		Total	
Club	Season	Division	Apps	Goals	Apps	Goals	Apps	Goals	Apps	Goals	Apps	Goals
Leeds United	1995–96	Premier League	15	0	2	0	2	0	0	0	19	0
Leeds United	1996–97	Premier League	7	0	0	0	2	0	—		9	0
Leeds United	1997–98	Premier League	0	0	0	0	0	0	—		0	0
Leeds United	Total		22	0	2	0	4	0	0	0	28	0
Bury (loan)	1997–98	First Division	6	1	0	0	0	0	—		6	1
Nottingham Forest	1998–99	Premier League	8	0	1	0	3	0	—		12	0
Nottingham Forest	1999–2000	First Division	22	0	3	0	2	0	—		27	0
Nottingham Forest	2000–01	First Division	18	0	1	0	0	0	—		19	0
Nottingham Forest	2001–02	First Division	16	1	0	0	2	0	—		18	1
Nottingham Forest	Total		64	1	5	0	7	0	—		76	1
Preston North End (loan)	1998–99	Second Division	5	0	0	0	0	0	0	0	5	0
Oldham Athletic (loan)	1998–99	Second Division	4	0	0	0	0	0	0	0	4	0
Bradford City	2002–03	First Division	44	15	1	0	1	0	—		46	15
Bradford City	2003–04	First Division	33	5	1	1	1	0	—		35	6
Bradford City	Total		77	20	2	1	2	0	—		81	21
Sheffield United	2003–04	First Division	14	9	0	0	0	0	—		14	9
Sheffield United	2004–05	Championship	43	15	5	1	2	2	—		50	18
Sheffield United	2005–06	Championship	1	1	0	0	0	0	—		1	1
Sheffield United	Total		58	25	5	1	2	2	—		65	28
Sunderland	2005–06	Premier League	21	1	1	0	0	0	—		22	1
Burnley	2005–06	Championship	9	3	0	0	0	0	—		9	3
Burnley	2006–07	Championship	35	14	0	0	1	0	—		36	14
Burnley	2007–08	Championship	25	11	1	0	2	2	—		28	13
Burnley	Total		69	28	1	0	3	2	—		73	30
Charlton Athletic	2007–08	Championship	16	2	0	0	0	0	—		16	2
Charlton Athletic	2008–09	Championship	27	7	1	0	0	0	—		28	7
Charlton Athletic	2009–10	League One	2	0	0	0	1	0	0	0	3	0
Charlton Athletic	Total		45	9	1	0	1	0	—		47	9
Barnsley	2009–10	Championship	30	6	1	0	0	0	—		31	6
Barnsley	2010–11	Championship	34	7	0	0	0	0	—		34	7
Barnsley	2011–12	Championship	32	8	1	0	0	0	—		33	8
Barnsley	Total		96	21	2	0	0	0	—		98	21
Leeds United	2012–13	Championship	8	1	0	0	2	0	—		10	1
Bradford City	2012–13	League Two	7	0	0	0	0	0	1 (Note: Appearances in Football League Trophy)	0	8	0
Bradford City	2013–14	League One	8	1	0	0	0	0	0	0	8	1
Career total			490	108	19	2	20	4	1	0	530	114

== Honours ==
Leeds United

- Football League Cup runner-up: 1995–96

Individual

- Bradford City Player of the Year: 2002–03

== See also ==
- List of Scotland international footballers born outside Scotland
- List of Scottish football families
