= Gareth Ormshaw =

South African soccer player

Garath Ormshaw
Personal information
- Date of birth: 8 July 1979 (age 45)
- Place of birth: Durban, South Africa
- Position(s): Goalkeeper

Senior career*
Years	Team	Apps	(Gls)
1997–1999	Crystal Palace	0	(0)
- Maidenhead United
- Ajax Cape Town
- Hellenic
- Silver Stars
- Lamontville Golden Arrows
- *Club domestic league appearances and goals

Garath Ormshaw (born 8 July 1979 in South Africa) is a South African retired footballer.

== Career ==
After failing to make an appearance for English Premier League side Crystal Palace, Ormshaw played for Ajax Cape Town, Hellenic, Silver Stars and Lamontville Golden Arrows in the South African top flight.
