= Adam Farley =

English footballer

Personal information
- Full name: Adam John Farley
- Date of birth: 12 January 1980 (age 46)
- Place of birth: Liverpool, England
- Position: Central defender

Youth career
- 1994–98: Everton

Senior career*
| Years | Team | Apps | (Gls) |
| 1998–2000 | Everton | 1 | (0) |
| 2000–2001 | Altrincham | 34 | (1) |
| 2001–2004 | Droylsden | | |
| 2004–2005 | Witton Albion | | |
| 2005–2009 | Marine | | |
| 2010 | Leigh Genesis | 9 | (0) |
| 2010–2011 | Formby | | |
| 2011 | Burscough | | |
| 2011–2012 | AFC Liverpool | | |
- * Club domestic league appearances and goals

Adam Farley (born 12 January 1980) is an English footballer who most recently played for AFC Liverpool. He is a defender.

== Career ==
Farley joined Everton as a schoolboy and was part of their 1998 FA Youth Cup-winning team; he was man of the match in the second leg of the final. He made one first team appearance, coming on as a substitute against Derby County in February 1999, and was substitute at West Ham United and Tottenham Hotspur. However, at the end of February 1999 he broke his cheekbone and jaw in an under-19s match, and he made no further first team appearances before being released in May 2000.

He joined Altrincham in 2000, making 34 league appearances and scoring one goal for the club. He joined Droylsden at the start of the 2001–02 season, staying with them for three years. Droylsden enjoyed the best season in their history in 2003-2004 while captained by Farley, winning four trophies, and he collected player of the year awards in 2002–03 and 2003–04. In late 2004 he joined Witton Albion on loan.

Farley returned to his home city of Liverpool at the start of the 2005–06 season, signing for Marine, where he collected the player of the year award in the 2006–07 season. He also won the Liverpool senior cup with Marine beating Liverpool FC in the final 2–1.

In 2009 Farley was banned from football for 9 months and fined £250 for betting against his own team in two matches, one of which he played in.

After a brief stint at Burscough at the start of the 2010–11 season, Farley signed for Leigh Genesis to help out a friend and former teammate, Mark Maddox. In December, he moved with teammate John Lawless to Formby. The pair only played in two games before manager Gary Martindale and the entire first team resigned in January 2011. Farley and Lawless were swiftly signed by Burscough, but in November 2011 Farley moved to A.F.C. Liverpool and was a member of their first team squad in 2011–12.

== Honours ==
=== Club ===
Everton

- FA Youth Cup 1998 – Winner

Droylsden

- Northern Premier League 2004 – Runner-Up
- Northern Premier League Challenge Cup 2004 – Winner
- Peter Swales Shield 2004 – Winner
- Manchester Premier Cup 2004 – Winner

Marine

- Liverpool Senior Cup 2008 – Winner

=== Individual ===
Droylsden

- Players Player of the Year: 2003
- Players Player of the Year: 2004

Marine

- Players Player of the Year: 2007

== Personal life ==
Farley was born in Liverpool and attended both primary and secondary schools in Croxteth, Merseyside. His secondary school De La Salle Humanities College, was also attended by Wayne Rooney and Francis Jeffers.
