= Paul Pettinger =

English footballer (born 1975)

Personal information
- Full name: Paul Allen Pettinger
- Date of birth: 1 October 1975 (age 51)
- Place of birth: Sheffield, England
- Position: Goalkeeper

Team information
- Current team: Cleethorpes Town (goalkeeper coach)

Youth career
- –1992: Leeds United

Senior career*
| Years | Team | Apps | (Gls) |
| 1992–1996 | Leeds United | 0 | (0) |
- → Kettering Town (loan)
| 1994–1995 | → Torquay United (loan) | 3 | (0) |
| 1995 | → Halifax Town (loan) | 7 | (0) |
| 1995 | → Rotherham United (loan) | 1 | (0) |
| 1996 | Gillingham | 0 | (0) |
| 1996–1997 | Carlisle United | 0 | (0) |
| 1997–2001 | Rotherham United | 16 | (0) |
| 2001–2003 | Lincoln City | 3 | (0) |
| 2002 | → Kettering Town (loan) | 12 | (0) |
| 2002–03 | → Telford United (loan) | 3 | (0) |
| 2003 | Gainsborough Trinity | 14 | (0) |
| 2003–2004 | Kettering Town | 26 | (0) |
| 2004 | Hucknall Town | 16 | (0) |
| 2004–2005 | Harrogate Town | 41 | (0) |
| 2005–2007 | Stalybridge Celtic | 68 | (0) |
| 2007 | Worksop Town | 11 | (0) |
| 2007–2008 | Ilkeston Town | 27 | (0) |
| 2008 | Frickley Athletic | 0 | (0) |
| 2008 | Belper Town | ? | (?) |
| 2008–2009 | Matlock Town | 7 | (0) |
| 2010 | Sheffield | 1 | (0) |
| Total | | 256 | (0) |
- * Club domestic league appearances and goals

Paul Allen Pettinger (born 1 October 1975) is an English former professional footballer and coach who is a goalkeeping coach for Worsbrough Bridge Athletic.

He played as a goalkeeper and after coming through the Leeds United academy and various loan spells with Kettering Town, Torquay United, Halifax Town and Gillingham, he went on to play in the Football League for Carlisle United, Rotherham United and Lincoln City. He later went on to play Non-league football for Telford United, Gainsborough Trinity, Hucknall Town, Harrogate Town, Stalybridge Celtic, Worksop Town, Ilkeston Town, Frickley Athletic, Matlock Town and Sheffield

He represented England at schoolboy and youth level.

== Playing career ==
Pettinger played for Barnsley schools before beginning his senior career as a trainee with Leeds United, turning professional in October 1992. He won an FA Youth Cup winners' medal with Leeds, playing in the side that beat Manchester United in the final. He failed to make the Leeds first team and in December 1994 joined Torquay United on loan. In February 1995 he joined Conference side Halifax Town on loan, playing seven times before the end of the season. He also played six times on loan for Kettering Town in the same season. In August 1995 he joined Rotherham United on loan, but made just one appearance, as a substitute, before returning to Leeds.

In March 1996, Pettinger joined Gillingham on a free transfer, but was released at the end of the season without making his debut. In August 1996 he joined Carlisle United, but failed to appear in their league team. In August 1997 he joined Rotherham United, but again struggled to make regular appearances. He finally forced his way into the team towards the end of the 2000–01 season, at one point playing a career best six football league games in a row, as Rotherham won promotion.

In July 2001 he joined Lincoln City on a free transfer, but played just five times in two years. In March 2002 he joined Kettering Town on loan and in December 2002 joined Telford United on loan. He joined Gainsborough Trinity in February 2003 and in May 2003 joined Kettering Town. He struggled with the travelling from his Barnsley home to Kettering and in February 2004 left to join Hucknall Town. He helped Hucknall win the Northern Premier League title before leaving in the 2004 close season to join Harrogate Town.

He left Harrogate, having missed just one game the previous season, to join Stalybridge Celtic in May 2005. He missed just one game the following season and remained a regular before moving on to Worksop Town in February 2007 for an undisclosed small fee. He played in 11 games for Worksop that season.

He later joined Ilkeston Town from where he moved to Frickley Athletic in January 2008. He subsequently joined Belper Town, moving to Matlock Town in December 2008. In September 2010 he joined Sheffield F.C. debuting in the 2–0 Northern Premier League Division One South away defeat to Carlton Town on 18 September 2010.

== Coaching career ==
After spending a decade out of the game, in July 2020 Pettinger joined the coaching staff at Worsbrough Bridge Athletic. In 2024 he joined the Coaching staff managed by Craig Rouse and assistant manager Lee Stratford at Cleethorpes Town Gaining promotion to the Northern Premier -Premier division for the first time in the clubs History.

== Other interests ==
Plays cricket for his local team Wombwell Main Cricket Club
