= Adam Eaton (footballer) =

English footballer (born 1980)

Personal information
- Date of birth: 2 May 1980 (age 46)
- Place of birth: Wigan, England
- Position: Defender

Youth career
- Years: Team
- 1996–1999: Everton
| 1999–2003 | Preston North End | 14 | (0) |
| 2003 | → Mansfield Town (loan) | 12 | (0) |
| 2004 | Mansfield Town | 13 | (0) |

Adam Eaton (born 2 May 1980) is a former professional footballer, who after starting out as a trainee at Everton, played for Preston North End and Mansfield Town before retiring due to a serious hip injury in 2006.
