= Matthew Smithard =

English footballer

Personal information
- Full name: Matthew Smithard
- Date of birth: 13 June 1976 (age 50)
- Place of birth: Leeds, England
- Position: Midfielder

Youth career
- 1992–1996: Leeds United

Senior career*
Years	Team	Apps	(Gls)
1996–1997	Bradford City	1	(0)
1997–1999	Farsley Celtic	?	(?)
1999–2002	Ossett Town	?	(?)
2002–2004	Farsley Celtic	?	(?)
2004–2006	Guiseley	?	(?)
Total		?	(?)
- * Club domestic league appearances and goals

Matthew Smithard (born 13 June 1976) is an English former professional footballer who played as a midfielder.

== Career ==
Born in Leeds, Smithard began his career with the youth team of hometown club Leeds United, winning the 1993 FA Youth Cup. However, he never played a first-team game for the club, and Smithard began his professional career during the 1996–97 season with Bradford City, making one appearance for them in the Football League. After dropping down to non-League football due to injury, Smithard played with a number of teams including Farsley Celtic, Ossett Town and Guiseley.
