= Steven Hawe =

Northern Irish footballer (born 1980)

Personal information
- Date of birth: 23 December 1980 (age 45)
- Place of birth: Magherafelt, Northern Ireland
- Position: Defender

Youth career
- Maghera Colts
- –1997: Coagh United
- 1997–2000: Blackburn Rovers

Senior career*
Years	Team	Apps	(Gls)
2000–2001	Blackburn Rovers	0	(0)
2000	→ Blackpool (loan)	2	(0)
2000–2001	→ Halifax Town (loan)	8	(0)
- Portadown
- Coagh United
2003–2004	Glenavon	25	(2)
- Coagh United
Total		35	(2)

International career
1996	Northern Ireland Schoolboys	7	(0)
1998–1999	Northern Ireland U18	5	(0)
2001	Northern Ireland U21	2	(0)

Managerial career
- 2014–2015: Magherafelt Sky Blues (assistant)
- 2015–2016: Loughgall
- * Club domestic league appearances and goals

Steven Hawe (born 23 December 1980) is a Northern Irish former footballer who played as a defender for both Blackpool and Halifax Town in the Football League Third Division. He is the father of Luke, Harry and Thomas who both plays for Ballymena utd.

== Career statistics ==
=== Club ===
Appearances and goals by club, season and competition
Club	Season	League			National Cup		League Cup		Other		Total	
Club	Season	Division	Apps	Goals	Apps	Goals	Apps	Goals	Apps	Goals	Apps	Goals
Blackpool (loan)	2000–01	Third Division	2	0	0	0	0	0	0	0	2	0
Halifax Town (loan)	2000–01	Third Division	8	0	1	0	0	0	1	0	10	0
Glenavon	2003–04	Irish Premier League	25	2	4	0	6	0	3	1	38	3
Career total			35	2	5	0	6	0	4	1	50	3
