= Paul Shepherd =

English footballer

Personal information
- Full name: Paul David Edward Shepherd
- Date of birth: 17 November 1977 (age 48)
- Place of birth: Leeds, England
- Height: 6 ft 0 in (1.83 m)
- Position: Full-back

Senior career*
Years	Team	Apps	(Gls)
1995–1999	Leeds United	1	(0)
1998	→ Ayr United (loan)	6	(1)
1999	→ Tranmere Rovers (loan)	1	(0)
1999–2000	Ayr United	21	(1)
2000	Keflavík ÍF	12	(?)
2000–2001	Scunthorpe United	1	(0)
2001	Luton Town	7	(0)
2001–2002	Oldham Athletic	0	(0)
2001–2002	→ Scarborough (loan)	10	(2)
2002–2003	Scarborough	35	(6)
2003–2004	Leigh RMI	29	(1)
2004–2005	Harrogate Town	26	(3)
2005	Stalybridge Celtic	16	(2)

International career
1997	England U20	3	(1)
- * Club domestic league appearances and goals

Paul David Edward Shepherd (born 17 November 1977) is an English former professional footballer who played as a full-back.

Whilst at Leeds he made one first team appearance in October 1996; a 3–0 defeat away to Arsenal at Highbury. He was a part of the England squad at the 1997 FIFA World Youth Championship.

On 17 June 2021, at Leeds Crown Court, Shepherd was found guilty of four charges relating to possessing a firearm and Class A drugs after a three-day trial.
