= Wesley Boyle =

Northern Irish footballer

Personal information
- Full name: Wesley Samuel Boyle
- Date of birth: 30 March 1979 (age 47)
- Place of birth: Portadown, Northern Ireland
- Position: Midfielder

Team information
- Current team: Loughgall

Youth career
- Leeds United

Senior career*
Years	Team	Apps	(Gls)
1995–1996	Portadown	2	(0)
1996–2002	Leeds United	1	(0)
2002–2012	Portadown	200	(0)
2003	→ Loughgall	2	(1)
2012–2015	Loughgall	1	(0)

International career
1998–2001	Northern Ireland U21	7	(1)
2013	Northern Ireland Juniors		
- * Club domestic league appearances and goals

Wesley Boyle (born 30 March 1979) from Northern Ireland is a football midfielder, who currently works as a coach, having last played for Loughgall F.C. Boyle started his career as an apprentice with Leeds United.
