= Matt Jones (footballer, born 1980) =

Welsh footballer and manager

Personal information
- Full name: Matthew Jones
- Date of birth: 1 September 1980 (age 46)
- Place of birth: Llanelli, Wales
- Position: Midfielder

Team information
- Current team: Wales U21 (manager)

Youth career
- 1997–2000: Leeds United

Senior career*
Years	Team	Apps	(Gls)
1997–2000	Leeds United	23	(0)
2000–2004	Leicester City	27	(1)
2007–2009	Llanelli	23	(1)
Total		73	(2)

International career
1999–2003	Wales	13	(0)

Managerial career
- 2020–2022: Wales U18
- 2022–: Wales U21
- * Club domestic league appearances and goals

Matthew Jones (born 1 September 1980 in Llanelli, Wales) is a Welsh former international footballer. He made his professional debut in the Premier League for Leeds United and played his last professional game for his home town club Llanelli in the Welsh Premier League. He has played centre-midfield for most of his career, though sometimes appeared at right back. He formerly played for Leeds United and Leicester City.

== Playing career ==
Jones was born in Llanelli, Wales and joined the Leeds United Youth Academy in 1994 at the age of fourteen. He transferred to Leicester City in December 2000 for a fee of £3.5million. He scored one league goal, in a 2–1 home defeat to Middlesbrough on 17 September 2001.

Intended to be a replacement for Neil Lennon at Leicester City, manager Peter Taylor hailed Jones as the new Lennon, but his time with Leicester was littered with injuries. He spent a year out with a knee ligament injury received when tackling Gary McAllister in Liverpool's 1–0 win against Leicester in January 2002. In August 2003 he trained with Nottingham Forest, but on his return to Leicester three weeks later was ruled out, initially for four further months, with a back injury.

After numerous operations in a bid to recover Jones decided to retire in 2004 at the age of 23. His last international game for Wales was a 2–0 away defeat to USA in May 2003, receiving a red card during his 13th appearance.

In September 2007, Jones announced he would come out of retirement to play for Llanelli in the Welsh Premier League. Jones featured sporadically for Llanelli over two seasons, making 23 league appearances, scoring one goal and contributing while studying for his coaching qualifications by winning the Welsh Premier league for the first time in the club's history and furthering their success with a league cup final title completing the double that year. He has also added appearances in the Welsh Cup Final and the Champions League to his CV.

== Coaching ==
In September 2021 Jones was appointed manager of the Wales national under-21 football team having previously managed the Wales under-18 team.

== Media ==
Since his playing retirement Jones worked within the sports media including appearances for BBC Sport, Sky Sports and John Barnes Soccer Night and has both written a column on the BBC Sport website and been featured as part of the BBC Wales website Raise your game series.

== Personal ==
Jones has taken part in many marathons, including the London marathon and various charity events in the aid of his good friend, Gary Speed. He lives in his hometown with his wife and four children.
