= Rob Bowman (footballer) =

English footballer (born 1975)

Personal information
- Full name: Robert Alexander Bowman
- Date of birth: 21 November 1975 (age 50)
- Place of birth: Durham, England
- Position: Defender

Senior career*
Years	Team	Apps	(Gls)
1992–1997	Leeds United	7	(0)
1997	Rotherham United	13	(0)
1997–2000	Carlisle United	46	(2)
2000–2001	Bohemians	5	(0)
- Gateshead

International career
1993	England U18	3	(0)
- * Club domestic league appearances and goals

Robert Alexander Bowman (born 21 November 1975) is an English footballer who played professionally for Leeds United, Rotherham United and Carlisle United.

== Career ==
Bowman was a defender who represented Leeds United, Rotherham United, Carlisle United, Bohemian F.C. and Gateshead F.C. amongst others during his career. He made his first team debut for Leeds as a 17-year-old and won the FA Youth Cup with Leeds in 1993 against a Manchester United side which included the likes of Gary Neville and Paul Scholes. He appeared in the famous Jimmy Glass game against Plymouth Argyle, in which the goalkeeper scored in the 94th minute to keep Carlisle United in the Football League.

He played in the UEFA Europa League for Bohemians in 2000/2001.
