= Mark Ford (footballer) =

English footballer

Personal information
- Full name: Mark Stuart Ford
- Date of birth: 10 October 1975 (age 51)
- Place of birth: Pontefract, England
- Position: Midfielder

Youth career
- Leeds United

Senior career*
Years	Team	Apps	(Gls)
1993–1997	Leeds United	29	(1)
1997–1999	Burnley	48	(1)
1999–2000	Lommel	15	(0)
2000–2001	Torquay United	28	(3)
2001–2003	Darlington	57	(9)
2003	→ Leigh RMI (loan)	13	(0)
2003–2004	Harrogate Town		
2006–200x	Tadcaster Albion		
Total		190	(14)

International career
1993	England U18	5	(0)
1996	England U21	2	(0)
- * Club domestic league appearances and goals

Mark Stuart Ford (born 10 October 1975) is an English former professional footballer who played in the Football League for Leeds United, Burnley, Torquay United and Darlington and in the Belgian First Division for Lommel. He was capped twice for the England under-21s.

== Career ==
Ford was born in Pontefract and attended Tadcaster Grammar School.

He began his football career as an apprentice with Leeds United, and was part of the Leeds team that won the FA Youth Cup in 1993. Ford turned professional in March 1993. A hard-tackling midfielder, once he broke into the first team he was considered as a future replacement for David Batty. However, despite playing in the 1996 League Cup final and scoring once in the league against Sunderland, he struggled to establish himself at Elland Road and moved on to Division Two club Burnley, managed by Chris Waddle, in July 1997 for a fee reported as £275,000.

He had a successful first season at Turf Moor, but broke an ankle on the opening day of the following season. After three months out he struggled to regain his place in new manager Stan Ternent's side and was released in the summer. In July 1999 he joined Belgian First Division side Lommel at the same time as Millwall's Kim Grant.

He returned to the UK at the end of the 1999–2000 season, and signed for Torquay United on a free transfer under the Bosman ruling, turning down offers from Darlington, Hull City and Rotherham United. He was made captain in the absence of the injured Brian Healy, but in February 2001 he was sold to Darlington for £15,000, helping Darlington against their battle against relegation instead of doing the same for Torquay.

After two years with Darlington he joined Conference side Leigh RMI on loan, before being released at the end of the 2002–2003 season. He then signed for Northern Premier League club Harrogate Town after a trial, and in 2006 was playing for Tadcaster Albion in the Northern Counties East League.

== Honours ==
Leeds United

- Football League Cup runner-up: 1995–96
