= Andy Couzens =

English footballer

Personal information
- Date of birth: 4 June 1975 (age 51)
- Place of birth: Shipley, England
- Height: 5 ft 9 in (1.75 m)
- Position: Midfielder

Youth career
- Leeds United

Senior career*
Years	Team	Apps	(Gls)
1993–1997	Leeds United	29	(1)
1997–1999	Carlisle United	43	(2)
1999	→ Blackpool (loan)	4	(0)
1999–2000	Blackpool	17	(0)
Total		93	(3)
- * Club domestic league appearances and goals

Andy Couzens (born 4 June 1975) is an English former professional footballer who played as a midfielder.

He notably played in the Premier League for Leeds United, as well as in the Football League for both Carlisle United and Blackpool.

== Playing career ==
He was born in Shipley, and started his career with Leeds United, for whom he played in the 1993 FA Youth Cup final, when they beat Manchester United. He managed 29 Premier League appearances for Leeds, scoring once against Coventry City. He scored once in the League Cup against Notts County. For a while he was tipped for a bright future in the game, but he never lived up to expectations and in 1997 he dropped down two divisions to sign for Carlisle United.

After Carlisle United were relegated in 1998 and narrowly avoided relegation from the Football League completely a year later, he signed for Blackpool in Division Two but was unable to prevent their relegation at the end of the 1999–2000 season. He then left the Bloomfield Road club and his career was over at a professional level by the time he turned 25.

== Personal life ==
Couzens works for Leeds United as a host in their hospitality suite; he is also a personal trainer.
