= List of Leeds United F.C. seasons =

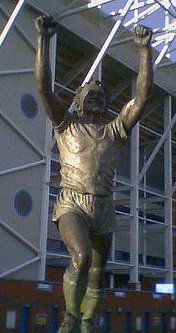
The statue of Billy Bremner, who played for Leeds United between 1959 and 1976 and captained them to cup success in 1968 and 1972.

Leeds United Football Club were founded in October 1919, taking the place in the Midland League vacated by Leeds City Reserves, and were elected to The Football League for the 1920–21 season. They won the Second Division title four years later to gain promotion to the top tier of English football, but had to wait almost 50 years before winning any major silverware, with success in the 1968 Football League Cup final accompanied by success in Europe in the final of the Inter-Cities Fairs Cup. The following season brought league success when Leeds won the First Division championship. Their success continued into the 1970s with victory in the 1971 Inter-Cities Fairs Cup final, the 1972 FA Cup final, another league title in the 1973–74 season and runners-up in the 1975 European Cup final. Leeds won the Second Division title in the 1989–90 season and were promoted back to the First Division. A third league title in the 1991–92 season, a second FA Charity Shield in the 1992 FA Charity Shield and a semi-final appearance in the UEFA Champions League in 2001, preceded a period of turbulence which culminated in relegation to League One in the 2006–07 season. They dropped out of the top two tiers of English football for the first time in their history, in a season that saw them deducted fifteen points for going into administration. In 2010, Leeds United were promoted back into the Championship. Ten years later, in 2020, the club were promoted back to the Premier League after a 16-year absence.

Leeds league performances

Leeds United have won the League Championship three times, four Second Division titles, the FA Cup once, the League Cup once, the Charity Shield twice and the Inter-Cities Fairs Cup twice. All these honours were won under the management of either Arthur Fairclough, Don Revie, Howard Wilkinson and Marcelo Bielsa . The club have also been runners-up five times in the League Championship, three times in the FA Cup, once each in the League Cup, the Charity Shield, the Inter-Cities Fairs Cup, the Cup Winners' Cup and the European Cup, and lost the play-off to keep the Inter-City Fairs Cup trophy.

== Seasons ==
Season	League									FA Cup	EFL Cup (Note: The EFL Cup was founded in 1961.)	Europe / Other		Top goalscorer(s) (Note: Goals in all competitions (Football League or Premier League, FA Cup, EFL Cup, European and other Football Association (FA) and Football League domestic cup competitions) are counted.)		Avg. Att. (Note: Attendance in all competitions (Football League or Premier League, FA Cup, EFL Cup, European and other FA and Football League domestic cup competitions) at games classed as home fixtures are counted towards the average.)
Season	Division (Tier)	Pld	W	D	L	GF	GA	Pts	Pos	FA Cup	EFL Cup	Europe / Other		Player(s)	Goals	Avg. Att.
1919–20	ML	34	11	9	14	56	56	31	12th	DNE				Not known (Note: There is no record of the scorers or attendance figures for the 1919–20 season.)		Not known
1920–21	Div 2 (2)	42	14	10	18	40	45	38	14th	PR (Note: Leeds won their extra preliminary and preliminary round ties but withdrew before their first round qualifying tie.)				Robert Thompson	12	14,967
1921–22	Div 2 (2)	42	16	13	13	48	38	45	8th	R1				Tommy Howarth	13	13,645
1922–23	Div 2 (2)	42	18	11	13	43	36	47	7th	R2				Percy Whipp	16	13,420
1923–24	Div 2 (2)	42	21	12	9	61	35	54	1st	R3				Jack Swann	18	16,313
1924–25	Div 1 (1)	42	11	12	19	46	59	34	18th	R1				Jack Swann	11	23,001
1925–26	Div 1 (1)	42	14	8	20	64	76	36	19th	R3				Tom Jennings	26	21,382
1926–27	Div 1 (1)	42	11	8	23	69	88	30	21st	R4				Tom Jennings	37	22,073
1927–28	Div 2 (2)	42	25	7	10	98	49	57	2nd	R3				Tom Jennings Jock White	21	21,835
1928–29	Div 1 (1)	42	16	9	17	71	84	41	13th	R4				Charlie Keetley	22	22,427
1929–30	Div 1 (1)	42	20	6	16	79	63	46	5th	R4				Russell Wainscoat	18	20,910
1930–31	Div 1 (1)	42	12	7	23	68	81	31	21st	R5				Charlie Keetley	23	15,755
1931–32	Div 2 (2)	42	22	10	10	78	54	54	2nd	R3				Charlie Keetley	23	14,079
1932–33	Div 1 (1)	42	15	14	13	59	62	44	8th	R5				Arthur Hydes	20	17,473
1933–34	Div 1 (1)	42	17	8	17	75	66	42	9th	R3				Arthur Hydes	16	16,052
1934–35	Div 1 (1)	42	13	12	17	75	92	38	18th	R4				Arthur Hydes	25	16,344
1935–36	Div 1 (1)	42	15	11	16	66	64	41	11th	R5				George Brown	20	20,341
1936–37	Div 1 (1)	42	15	4	23	60	80	34	19th	R3				Arthur Hydes	11	18,230
1937–38	Div 1 (1)	42	14	15	13	64	69	43	9th	R4				Gordon Hodgson	26	21,979
1938–39	Div 1 (1)	42	16	9	17	59	67	41	13th	R4				Gordon Hodgson	21	19,444
The Football League and FA Cup were suspended until after the Second World War.
1945–46	n/a (Note: The FA Cup was contested in 1945–46, but the Football League did not resume until the following season.)									R3				George Ainsley (Note: FA Cup goals only.)	2	18,000
1946–47	Div 1 (1)	42	6	6	30	45	90	18	22nd	R3				George Ainsley	12	26,040
1947–48	Div 2 (2)	42	14	8	20	62	72	36	18th	R3				Albert Wakefield	21	28,521
1948–49	Div 2 (2)	42	12	13	17	55	63	37	15th	R3				Len Browning	14	29,402
1949–50	Div 2 (2)	42	17	13	12	54	45	47	5th	QF				Frank Dudley	16	32,124
1950–51	Div 2 (2)	42	20	8	14	63	55	48	5th	R4				Len Browning	20	27,127
1951–52	Div 2 (2)	42	18	11	13	59	57	47	6th	R5				Ray Iggleden	20	26,585
1952–53	Div 2 (2)	42	14	15	13	71	63	43	10th	R3				John Charles	27	20,432
1953–54	Div 2 (2)	42	15	13	14	89	81	43	10th	R3				John Charles	43 (Note: 42 league goals.)	22,709
1954–55	Div 2 (2)	42	23	7	12	70	53	53	4th	R3				Harold Brook	16	21,695
1955–56	Div 2 (2)	42	23	6	13	80	60	52	2nd	R3				John Charles	29	25,152
1956–57	Div 1 (1)	42	15	14	13	72	63	44	8th	R3				John Charles	39 (Note: 38 league goals.)	32,721
1957–58	Div 1 (1)	42	14	9	19	51	63	37	17th	R3				Hugh Baird	20	25,168
1958–59	Div 1 (1)	42	15	9	18	57	74	39	15th	R3				Alan Shackleton	17	25,334
1959–60	Div 1 (1)	42	12	10	20	65	92	34	21st	R3				John McCole	23	21,877
1960–61	Div 2 (2)	42	14	10	18	75	83	38	14th	R3	R4			John McCole	23	13,423
1961–62	Div 2 (2)	42	12	12	18	50	61	36	19th	R3	R4			Billy Bremner Jack Charlton	12	13,340
1962–63	Div 2 (2)	42	19	10	13	79	53	48	5th	R5	R3			Jim Storrie	27	20,376
1963–64	Div 2 (2)	42	24	15	3	71	34	63	1st	R4	R4			Albert Johanneson Ian Lawson	15	28,723
1964–65	Div 1 (1)	42	26	9	7	83	52	61	2nd	RU	R3			Jim Storrie	19	36,413
1965–66	Div 1 (1)	42	23	9	10	79	38	55	2nd	R4	R3	Inter-Cities Fairs Cup	SF	Peter Lorimer	19	34,601
1966–67	Div 1 (1)	42	22	11	9	62	42	55	4th	SF	R4	Inter-Cities Fairs Cup	RU	Johnny Giles	18	35,914
1967–68	Div 1 (1)	42	22	9	11	71	41	53	4th	SF	W	Inter-Cities Fairs Cup	W	Peter Lorimer	30	35,027
1968–69	Div 1 (1)	42	27	13	2	66	26	67	1st	R3	R4	Inter-Cities Fairs Cup	QF	Mick Jones	17	34,424
1969–70	Div 1 (1)	42	21	15	6	84	49	57	2nd	RU	R3	FA Charity Shield	W	Allan Clarke Mick Jones	26	35,324
1969–70	Div 1 (1)	42	21	15	6	84	49	57	2nd	RU	R3	European Cup	SF	Allan Clarke Mick Jones	26	35,324
1970–71	Div 1 (1)	42	27	10	5	72	30	64	2nd	R5	R2	Inter-Cities Fairs Cup	W	Allan Clarke	23	37,218
1970–71	Div 1 (1)	42	27	10	5	72	30	64	2nd	R5	R2	Inter-Cities Fairs Cup Trophy Play-Off	RU	Allan Clarke	23	37,218
1971–72	Div 1 (1)	42	24	9	9	73	31	57	2nd	W	R3	UEFA Cup	R1	Peter Lorimer	29	35,023
1972–73	Div 1 (1)	42	21	11	10	71	45	53	3rd	RU	R4	Cup Winners' Cup	RU	Allan Clarke	26	33,993
1973–74	Div 1 (1)	42	24	14	4	66	31	62	1st	R5	R2	UEFA Cup	R3	Mick Jones	17	37,026
1974–75	Div 1 (1)	42	16	13	13	57	49	45	9th	QF	R4	FA Charity Shield	RU	Allan Clarke	22	34,496
1974–75	Div 1 (1)	42	16	13	13	57	49	45	9th	QF	R4	European Cup	RU	Allan Clarke	22	34,496
1975–76	Div 1 (1)	42	21	9	12	65	46	51	5th	R4	R3			Duncan McKenzie	17	30,804
1976–77	Div 1 (1)	42	15	12	15	48	51	42	10th	SF	R2			Joe Jordan	12	31,176
1977–78	Div 1 (1)	42	18	10	14	63	53	46	9th	R3	SF			Ray Hankin	21	29,808
1978–79	Div 1 (1)	42	18	14	10	70	52	50	5th	R4	SF			John Hawley	17	27,964
1979–80	Div 1 (1)	42	13	14	15	46	50	40	11th	R3	R2	UEFA Cup	R2	Kevin Hird	8	22,813
1980–81	Div 1 (1)	42	17	10	15	39	47	44	9th	R3	R2			Carl Harris	10	21,105
1981–82	Div 1 (1)	42	10	12	20	39	61	42 (Note: The 1981–82 season saw the introduction of three points for a win.)	20th	R4	R2			Arthur Graham Frank Worthington	9	21,889
1982–83	Div 2 (2)	42	13	21	8	51	46	60	8th	R4	R3			Aiden Butterworth	13	17,025
1983–84	Div 2 (2)	42	16	12	14	55	56	60	10th	R3	R3			Tommy Wright	11	15,173
1984–85	Div 2 (2)	42	19	12	11	66	43	69	7th	R3	R3			Tommy Wright	15	15,504
1985–86	Div 2 (2)	42	15	8	19	56	72	53	14th	R3	R3	Full Members Cup	Grp	Ian Baird	12	12,715
1986–87	Div 2 (2)	42	19	11	12	58	44	68	4th (Note: Lost in the first ever play-off final to Charlton Athletic 2–1 in a replay after each team had won their home leg 1–0.)	SF	R2	Full Members Cup	R1	Ian Baird	19	18,362
1987–88	Div 2 (2)	44	19	12	13	61	51	69	7th	R3	R3	Full Members Cup	R2	John Sheridan	14	19,493
1988–89	Div 2 (2)	46	17	16	13	59	50	67	10th	R4	R3	Full Members Cup	R2	Bobby Davison	17	20,505
1989–90	Div 2 (2)	46	24	13	9	79	52	85	1st	R3	R2	Full Members Cup	R4	Gordon Strachan	18	26,865
1990–91	Div 1 (1)	38	19	7	12	65	47	64	4th	R4	SF	Full Members Cup	NF	Lee Chapman	31	25,779
1991–92	Div 1 (1)	42	22	16	4	74	37	82	1st	R3	QF	Full Members Cup	R2	Lee Chapman	20	27,668
1992–93	Prem (Note: The 22 top English clubs broke away from the Football League to form the FA Premier League as the new top tier of the English football pyramid.) (1)	42	12	15	15	57	62	51	17th	R4	R3	FA Charity Shield	W	Lee Chapman	17	27,585
1992–93	Prem (1)	42	12	15	15	57	62	51	17th	R4	R3	Champions League	R2	Lee Chapman	17	27,585
1993–94	Prem (1)	42	18	16	8	65	39	70	5th	R4	R2			Rod Wallace	17	33,327
1994–95	Prem (1)	42	20	13	9	59	38	73	5th	R5	R2			Tony Yeboah	13	30,959
1995–96	Prem (1)	38	12	7	19	40	57	43	13th	QF	RU	UEFA Cup	R2	Tony Yeboah	19	30,273
1996–97	Prem (1)	38	11	13	14	28	38	46	11th	R5	R3			Rod Wallace	8	30,348
1997–98	Prem (1)	38	17	8	13	57	46	59	5th	QF	R4			Jimmy Floyd Hasselbaink	22	32,303
1998–99	Prem (1)	38	18	13	7	62	34	67	4th	R5	R4	UEFA Cup	R2	Jimmy Floyd Hasselbaink	20 (Note: 18 league goals.)	36,028
1999–2000	Prem (1)	38	21	6	11	58	43	69	3rd	R5	R4	UEFA Cup	SF	Michael Bridges	21	37,579
2000–01	Prem (1)	38	20	8	10	64	43	68	4th	R4	R3	Champions League	SF	Mark Viduka	22	37,866
2001–02	Prem (1)	38	18	12	8	53	37	66	5th	R3	R4	UEFA Cup	R4	Mark Viduka	16	39,460
2002–03	Prem (1)	38	14	5	19	58	57	47	15th	QF	R3	UEFA Cup	R3	Mark Viduka	22	37,768
2003–04	Prem (1)	38	8	9	21	40	79	33	19th	R3	R3			Mark Viduka	12	36,119
2004–05	Champ (Note: The three divisions in the Football League were renamed. Division One became The Championship, Division Two became League One and Division Three became League Two.) (2)	46	14	18	14	49	52	60	14th	R3	R3			David Healy Brian Deane	7	28,814
2005–06	Champ (2)	46	21	15	10	57	38	78	5th (Note: Lost in the play-off final to Watford 3–0 at the Millennium Stadium.)	R3	R3			David Healy Rob Hulse	14	22,294
2006–07	Champ (2)	46	13	7	26	46	72	36 (Note: Deducted 10 points for entering administration.)	24th	R3	R3			David Healy	10	20,184
2007–08	League 1 (3)	46	27	10	9	72	38	76 (Note: Deducted 15 points for exiting administration without going via a company voluntary agreement.)	5th (Note: Lost the play-off final to Doncaster Rovers 1–0 at the new Wembley Stadium. Also lowest League finish.)	R1	R2	Football League Trophy	NQF	Jermaine Beckford	20	26,040
2008–09	League 1 (3)	46	26	6	14	77	49	84	4th (Note: Lost the play-off semi-final to Millwall 2–1 on aggregate.)	R2	R4	Football League Trophy	R2	Jermaine Beckford	34	22,849
2009–10	League 1 (3)	46	25	11	10	77	44	86	2nd	R4	R3	Football League Trophy	NF	Jermaine Beckford	31	23,116
2010–11	Champ (2)	46	19	15	12	81	70	72	7th	R3	R2			Luciano Becchio	20	26,739
2011–12	Champ (2)	46	17	10	19	65	68	61	14th	R3	R3			Ross McCormack	19	23,369
2012–13	Champ (2)	46	17	10	19	57	66	61	13th	R5	QF			Luciano Becchio	19	21,572
2013–14	Champ (2)	46	16	9	21	59	67	57	15th	R3	R3			Ross McCormack	29	25,088
2014–15	Champ (2)	46	15	11	20	50	61	56	15th	R3	R2			Mirco Antenucci	10	24,276
2015–16	Champ (2)	46	14	17	15	50	58	59	13th	R5	R1			Chris Wood	13	21,667
2016–17	Champ (2)	46	22	9	15	61	47	75	7th	R4	QF			Chris Wood	30	27,699
2017–18	Champ (2)	46	17	9	20	59	64	60	13th	R3	R4			Kemar Roofe	14	31,521
2018–19	Champ (2)	46	25	8	13	73	50	83	3rd (Note: Lost the play-off semi-final to Derby County 4–3 on aggregate.)	R3	R2			Kemar Roofe	15	33,834
2019–20	Champ (2)	46	28	9	9	77	35	93	1st	R3	R2			Patrick Bamford	16	34,834
2020–21	Prem (1)	38	18	5	15	62	54	59	9th	R3	R2			Patrick Bamford	17	474 (Note: 35 of the 38 games of Leeds United's 2020–21 Premier League season were played behind closed doors due to the COVID-19 pandemic in the United Kingdom. The games played with fans also had strict restrictions on the number of fans allowed in attendance.)
2021–22	Prem (1)	38	9	11	18	42	79	38	17th	R3	R4			Raphinha	11	36,405
2022–23	Prem (1)	38	7	10	21	48	78	31	19th	R5	R3			Rodrigo	15	36,502
2023–24	Champ (2)	46	27	9	10	81	43	90	3rd (Note: Lost the play-off final to Southampton 1–0 at the new Wembley Stadium.)	R5	R2			Crysencio Summerville	21	35,989
2024–25	Champ (2)	46	29	13	4	95	30	100	1st	R4	R1			Joël Piroe	19	36,216
2025–26	Prem (1)	38	11	14	13	49	56	47	14th	SF	R2			Dominic Calvert-Lewin	15	36,695

=== Overall ===
- Seasons spent at Level 1 of the football league system: 54
- Seasons spent at Level 2 of the football league system: 42
- Seasons spent at Level 3 of the football league system: 3
- WWII Absence: 7
- (As of the 2025–26 season)

== Key ==
Key to league record:

- Pld = Matches played
- W = Matches won
- D = Matches drawn
- L = Matches lost
- GF = Goals for
- GA = Goals against
- Pts = Points
- Pos = Final position

Key to divisions:

- Prem = Premier League
- Champ = EFL Championship
- Div 1 = Football League First Division
- Lge 1 = EFL League One
- Div 2 = Football League Second Division
- ML = Midland League
- n/a = Not applicable

Key to rounds:

- DNE = Did not enter
- PR = Preliminary round
- R1 = Round 1
- R2 = Round 2
- R3 = Round 3
- R4 = Round 4
- R5 = Round 5
- R6 = Round 6
- Grp = Group stage
- QF = Quarter-finals
- NQF = Northern quarter-finals
- SF = Semi-finals
- NF = Northern final
- RU = Runners-up
- W = Winners

Winners	Runners-up	Third place	Play-offs	Promoted	Relegated

Division shown in bold to indicate a change in division.
Top scorers shown in bold are players who were also top scorers in their division that season.
