= 1990–91 Leeds United A.F.C. season =

1990–91 season of Leeds United

Leeds United
1990–91 season
- Chairman: Leslie Silver
- Manager: Howard Wilkinson
- Stadium: Elland Road
- First Division: 4th
- FA Cup: Fourth round
- League Cup: Semi-finals
- Full Members Cup: Northern final
- Top goalscorer: League: Lee Chapman (21); All: Lee Chapman (31)
- Highest home attendance: 32,014 vs Manchester United (24 February 1991, League Cup)
- Lowest home attendance: 6,334 vs Derby County (22 January 1991, Full Members Cup)
- Average home league attendance: 25,779

The 1990–91 season saw Leeds United return to the Football League First Division after winning the Football League Second Division the previous season.

== First-team squad ==
Note: Flags indicate national team as defined under FIFA eligibility rules; some limited exceptions apply. Players may hold more than one non-FIFA nationality.

Pos.	Nation	Player
GK	ENG	Mervyn Day
GK	ENG	John Lukic
DF	IRL	Jim Beglin
DF	ENG	Chris Fairclough
DF	ENG	Peter Haddock
DF	ENG	Chris Kamara
DF	MLT	Dylan Kerr
DF	NIR	John McClelland
DF	ENG	Glynn Snodin
DF	ENG	Mel Sterland
DF	ENG	Mike Whitlow
DF	ENG	Chris Whyte

Pos.	Nation	Player
MF	ENG	David Batty
MF	ENG	Simon Grayson
MF	WAL	Vinnie Jones
MF	SCO	Gary McAllister
MF	WAL	Gary Speed
MF	SCO	Gordon Strachan (captain)
MF	ENG	Andy Williams
FW	ENG	Bobby Davison
FW	ENG	Lee Chapman
FW	ENG	John Pearson
FW	ENG	Carl Shutt
FW	ENG	Imre Varadi

== Final league table ==
Pos	Team	Pld	W	D	L	GF	GA	GD	Pts	Qualification or relegation
2	Liverpool	38	23	7	8	77	40	+37	76	Qualification for the UEFA Cup first round
3	Crystal Palace	38	20	9	9	50	41	+9	69	
4	Leeds United	38	19	7	12	65	47	+18	64	
5	Manchester City	38	17	11	10	64	53	+11	62	
6	Manchester United	38	16	12	10	58	45	+13	59 (Note: Arsenal deducted two points; Manchester United deducted one point due to a brawl in a game between both teams.)	Qualification for the Cup Winners' Cup first round

Source: World Football
Rules for classification: 1) Points; 2) Goal difference; 3) Goals scored

== Results ==
Leeds United's score comes first

=== Legend ===
Win	Draw	Loss

Date	Opponent	Venue	Result (Note: Leeds United's score written first)	Scorers	Attendance
25 August 1990	Everton	Away	3–2	Fairclough, Speed, Varadi	34,412
28 August 1990	Manchester United	Home	0–0	—	29,172
1 September 1990	Norwich City	Home	3–0	Chapman (2), Varadi	25,684
8 September 1990	Luton Town	Away	0–1	—	10,185
15 September 1990	Tottenham Hotspur	Home	0–2	—	31,342
23 September 1990	Sheffield United	Away	2–0	Pearson, Strachan	26,078
29 September 1990	Arsenal	Home	2–2	Chapman, Strachan (pen.)	30,085
6 October 1990	Crystal Palace	Away	1–1	Speed	21,676
20 October 1990	Queens Park Rangers	Home	2–3	Whyte, Chapman	27,443
27 October 1990	Aston Villa	Away	0–0	—	24,219
3 November 1990	Nottingham Forest	Home	3–1	Chapman, Strachan (pen.), McAllister	30,409
11 November 1990	Manchester City	Away	3–2	Chapman, Shutt, Strachan	27,782
17 November 1990	Derby County	Home	3–0	Chapman, Strachan, Speed	27,868
24 November 1990	Coventry City	Away	1–1	Chapman	16,183
1 December 1990	Southampton	Home	2–1	Fairclough, Shutt	29,341
8 December 1990	Manchester United	Away	1–1	Sterland	40,927
16 December 1990	Everton	Home	2–0	Strachan (pen.), Shutt	27,775
23 December 1990	Sunderland	Away	1–0	Sterland	23,773
26 December 1990	Chelsea	Home	4–1	Sterland, Chapman (2), Whitlow	30,893
29 December 1990	Wimbledon	Home	3–0	Chapman, Speed, Sterland	29,292
1 January 1991	Liverpool	Away	0–3	—	36,975
12 January 1991	Norwich City	Away	0–2	—	17,786
19 January 1991	Luton Town	Home	2–1	Strachan (pen.), Fairclough	27,010
2 February 1991	Tottenham Hotspur	Away	0–0	—	32,253
2 March 1991	Southampton	Away	0–2	—	16,585
9 March 1991	Coventry City	Home	2–0	Davison, Whyte	28,880
17 March 1991	Arsenal	Away	0–2	—	26,218
23 March 1991	Crystal Palace	Home	1–2	Speed	28,556
30 March 1991	Chelsea	Away	2–1	Shutt, Fairclough	17,585
2 April 1991	Sunderland	Home	5–0	Chapman (2), Shutt, Speed (2)	28,132
6 April 1991	Wimbledon	Away	1–0	Chapman	6,800
10 April 1991	Manchester City	Home	1–2	McAllister	28,757
13 April 1991	Liverpool	Home	4–5	Chapman (3), Shutt	31,460
17 April 1991	Queens Park Rangers	Away	0–2	—	10,998
23 April 1991	Derby County	Away	1–0	Shutt	12,666
4 May 1991	Aston Villa	Home	5–2	Price (o.g.), Chapman (2), Whyte, Shutt	29,188
8 May 1991	Sheffield United	Home	2–1	Sterland, Shutt	28,978
11 May 1991	Nottingham Forest	Away	3–4	Chapman (2), Shutt	25,067

=== FA Cup ===
Win	Draw	Loss

Round	Date	Opponent	Venue	Result	Scorers	Attendance
Third round	6 January 1991	Barnsley	Away	1–1	Sterland 81'	22,424
Third round replay	9 January 1991	Barnsley	Home	4–0	Smith (o.g.) 2', Chapman 6', McAllister 83', Strachan (pen.) 86'	19,773
Fourth round	27 January 1991	Arsenal	Away	0–0	—	30,905
Fourth round replay	30 January 1991	Arsenal	Home	1–1 (a.e.t.)	Chapman 59'	27,753
Fourth round second replay	13 February 1991	Arsenal	Away	0–0 (a.e.t.)	—	30,433
Fourth round third replay	16 February 1991	Arsenal	Home	1–2	Chapman 69'	27,190

=== Football League Cup ===
Win	Draw	Loss

Round	Date	Opponent	Venue	Result	Scorers	Attendance
Second round first leg	26 September 1990	Leicester City	Away	0–1	—	13,744
Second round second leg	10 October 1990	Leicester City	Home	3–0	Walsh (o.g.) 75', Speed 85', Strachan 87'	19,090
Third round	31 October 1990	Oldham Athletic	Home	2–0	Chapman 22', Speed 33'	26,327
Fourth round	27 November 1990	Queens Park Rangers	Away	3–0	McAllister 2', Fairclough 14', Chapman 19'	15,832
Fifth round	16 January 1991	Aston Villa	Home	4–1	Chapman 17', 80', McAllister 54', Speed 77'	28,176
Semi-final first leg	10 February 1991	Manchester United	Away	1–2	Whyte 70'	34,050
Semi-final second leg	24 February 1991	Manchester United	Home	0–1	—	32,014

=== Full Members' Cup ===
Win	Draw	Loss

Round	Date	Opponent	Venue	Result	Scorers	Attendance
Second round	19 December 1990	Wolverhampton Wanderers	Away	2–1	Varadi 20', McAllister 74'	11,080
Third round	22 January 1991	Derby County	Home	2–1	Shutt 25', Chapman 30'	6,334
Northern semi-final	20 February 1991	Manchester City	Home	2–0 (a.e.t.)	Williams 117', Strachan 120'	11,898
Northern final first leg	19 March 1991	Everton	Home	3–3	Sterland 1', Chapman 37', 70'	13,387
Northern final second leg	21 March 1991	Everton	Away	1–3 (a.e.t.)	Sterland 21'	12,603

== Transfers ==
=== Transfers in ===
Date	P	Player	From club	Transfer fee
1 Jun 1990	DF	(England) Chris Whyte	(England) West Bromwich Albion	£450,000
1 Jun 1990	GK	(England) John Lukic	(England) Arsenal	£1,000,000^{†}
2 Jul 1990	MF	(Scotland) Gary McAllister	(England) Leicester City	£1,000,000

^{†}Club record transfer fee at the time.

=== Transfers out ===
Date	P	Player	To club	Transfer fee
1 Jun 1990	FW	(England) Ian Baird	(England) Middlesbrough	£275,000
1 Jun 1990	DF	(England) Noel Blake	(England) Stoke City	Undisc.
1 Jun 1990	FW	(England) John Hendrie	(England) Middlesbrough	£275,000
1 Jun 1990	GK	(Italy) Alessandro Nista	(Italy) Ancona Calcio	Undisc.
1 Jun 1990	DF	(England) Chris O'Donnell	(England) Exeter City	Free
1 Jul 1990	DF	(England) Brendan Ormsby	(England) Doncaster Rovers	Free
1 Aug 1990	MF	(England) Mickey Thomas	(England) Stoke City	Free
11 Sep 1990	MF	(Wales) Vinnie Jones	(England) Sheffield United	£650,000
1 Nov 1990	MF	(England) Vince Hilaire	(England) Stoke City	Free

Total spending: ▼£1,250,000

=== Loaned out ===
Start date	End date	P	Player	To club
1 Dec 1990	1 Jun 1991	DF	(Republic of Ireland) Jim Beglin	(England) Blackburn Rovers
1 Mar 1991	1 Jul 1991	DF	(England) John Pearson	(England) Rotherham
