= 1991–92 Leeds United A.F.C. season =

1991–92 season of Leeds United

Leeds United
1991–92 season
- Chairman: Leslie Silver
- Manager: Howard Wilkinson
- Stadium: Elland Road
- First Division: 1st (champions)
- FA Cup: Third round
- League Cup: Fifth round
- Full Members Cup: Second round
- Top goalscorer: League: Lee Chapman (16); All: Lee Chapman (20)
- Highest home attendance: 32,673 vs Norwich City (2 May 1992, First Division)
- Lowest home attendance: 6,495 vs Nottingham Forest (22 October 1991, Full Members Cup)
- Average home league attendance: 27,668

The 1991–92 season saw Leeds United competing in the final season of the Football League First Division before its rebranding as the FA Premier League, doing so by being crowned champions.

== Season summary ==
Having finished fourth the previous season, Leeds clinched the First Division title in the 1991-1992 campaign, finishing ahead of archrivals Manchester United, which was only their second consecutive season as a First Division club. As champions of the Football League, Leeds United qualified for the European Cup, which was rebranded as the UEFA Champions League the next season. They lost just four league games all season, and were held to 1–1 draws both home and away by Manchester United (who also knocked them out of both domestic cups). Eric Cantona signed for the club mid-season, making his debut against Oldham Athletic on 8 February 1992, and scored three goals in the remainder of the season. Leeds clinched the title in the penultimate game of the season with a 3–2 win over Sheffield United. The first goal that day was scored by striker Rod Wallace, who had joined Leeds the previous summer from Southampton.

== Transfers ==
=== Transfers in ===
Date	Position	Name	From	Fee
6 June 1991	DF	(England) Tony Dorigo	(England) Chelsea	£1,300,000^{†}
11 June 1991	DF	(England) Jon Newsome	(England) Sheffield Wednesday	£150,000
1 July 1991	FW	(England) Rod Wallace	(England) Southampton	£1,600,000^{†}
1 July 1991	DF	(England) Ray Wallace	(England) Southampton	£100,000
1 July 1991	MF	(England) Steve Hodge	(England) Nottingham Forest	£900,000
15 July 1991	DF	(England) David Wetherall	(England) Sheffield Wednesday	£137,500
4 February 1992	FW	(France) Eric Cantona	(France) Nîmes	£900,000

^{†}Club record transfer fee at the time.

=== Transfers out ===
Date	Position	Name	To	Fee
1 June 1991	DF	(England) Peter Haddock	Retired	—
1 June 1991	DF	(Republic of Ireland) Jim Beglin	Retired	—
1 July 1991	FW	(England) John Pearson	(England) Barnsley	£135,000
3 September 1991	GK	(Wales) Neil Edwards	(England) Stockport County	£5,000
1 November 1991	DF	(England) Chris Kamara	(England) Luton Town	£150,000
1 February 1992	MF	(England) Andy Williams	(England) Notts County	£115,000
13 March 1992	MF	(England) Simon Grayson	(England) Leicester City	£50,000
27 March 1992	DF	(England) Mike Whitlow	(England) Leicester City	£250,000

=== Loans in ===
Start date	Position	Name	From	End date
22 February 1992	FW	(England) Tony Agana	(England) Notts County	1 June 1992

=== Loans out ===
Start date	Position	Name	To	End date
1 August 1991	DF	(England) Glynn Snodin	(England) Oldham Athletic	1 January 1992
1 August 1991	DF	(Malta) Dylan Kerr	(England) Doncaster Rovers	1 December 1991
1 September 1991	FW	(England) Bobby Davison	(England) Derby County	1 February 1992
1 December 1991	MF	(England) Andy Williams	(England) Port Vale	1 January 1992
1 December 1991	DF	(Malta) Dylan Kerr	(England) Blackpool	1 June 1992
1 February 1992	MF	(England) Imre Varadi	(England) Luton Town	1 March 1992
1 February 1992	DF	(England) Glynn Snodin	(England) Rotherham United	1 June 1992
1 March 1992	FW	(England) Bobby Davison	(England) Sheffield United	1 June 1992
1 March 1992	GK	(England) Mervyn Day	(England) Luton Town	1 April 1992
1 March 1992	DF	(England) John McClelland	(England) Notts County	1 June 1992
1 March 1992	DF	(England) Ray Wallace	(Wales) Swansea City	1 June 1992
1 April 1992	GK	(England) Mervyn Day	(England) Luton Town	1 June 1992

== First-team squad ==
Note: Flags indicate national team as defined under FIFA eligibility rules; some limited exceptions apply. Players may hold more than one non-FIFA nationality.

Pos.	Nation	Player
GK	ENG	Mervyn Day
GK	WAL	Neil Edwards
GK	ENG	John Lukic
GK	ENG	Paul Pettinger
DF	ENG	Rob Bowman
DF	ENG	Tony Dorigo
DF	ENG	Chris Fairclough
DF	IRL	Gary Kelly
DF	MLT	Dylan Kerr
DF	NIR	John McClelland
DF	ENG	Jon Newsome
DF	ENG	Mel Sterland
DF	ENG	Ray Wallace
DF	ENG	David Wetherall
DF	ENG	Mike Whitlow
DF	ENG	Chris Whyte
MF	ENG	David Batty
MF	ENG	Simon Grayson

Pos.	Nation	Player
MF	ENG	Steve Hodge
MF	ENG	Chris Kamara
MF	SCO	Gary McAllister
MF	ENG	Scott Sellars
MF	ENG	Glynn Snodin
MF	WAL	Gary Speed
MF	SCO	Gordon Strachan (captain)
MF	ENG	Mark Tinkler
MF	ENG	Andy Williams
FW	ENG	Tony Agana (on loan from Notts County)
FW	ENG	Lee Chapman
FW	ENG	Bobby Davison
FW	ENG	Carl Shutt
FW	ENG	Imre Varadi
FW	ENG	Rod Wallace
FW	ENG	Noel Whelan
FW	FRA	Eric Cantona

== Final league table ==
Pos	Team	Pld	W	D	L	GF	GA	GD	Pts	Qualification or relegation
1	Leeds United (C)	42	22	16	4	74	37	+37	82	Qualification for the UEFA Champions League first round and qualification for the FA Premier League
2	Manchester United	42	21	15	6	63	33	+30	78	Qualification for the UEFA Cup first round and qualification for the FA Premier League (Note: Manchester United also won the League Cup – that UEFA Cup qualifying place was passed down to the third-placed League team.)
3	Sheffield Wednesday	42	21	12	9	62	49	+13	75	Qualification for the UEFA Cup first round and qualification for the FA Premier League
4	Arsenal	42	19	15	8	81	46	+35	72	Qualification for the FA Premier League
5	Manchester City	42	20	10	12	61	48	+13	70	Qualification for the FA Premier League

Source: World Football
Rules for classification: 1) Points; 2) Goal difference; 3) Goals scored
(C) Champions

== Results ==
Leeds United's score comes first

=== Legend ===
Win	Draw	Loss

=== Football League First Division ===
Date	Opponent	Venue	Result (Note: Leeds United's score written first)	Scorers	Attendance
20 August 1991	Nottingham Forest	H	1–0	McAllister	29,457
24 August 1991	Sheffield Wednesday	H	1–1	Hodge	30,260
28 August 1991	Southampton	A	4–0	Speed (2), Strachan (2)	15,862
31 August 1991	Manchester United	A	1–1	Chapman	43,778
3 September 1991	Arsenal	H	2–2	Chapman, Strachan	29,396
7 September 1991	Manchester City	H	3–0	Batty, Dorigo, Strachan	29,986
14 September 1991	Chelsea	A	1–0	Shutt	23,439
18 September 1991	Coventry City	A	0–0	—	15,488
21 September 1991	Liverpool	H	1–0	Hodge	32,917
28 September 1991	Norwich City	A	2–2	Speed, Dorigo	15,828
1 October 1991	Crystal Palace	A	0–1	—	18,298
5 October 1991	Sheffield United	H	4–3	Hodge (2), Sterland (2)	28,362
19 October 1991	Notts County	A	4–2	Hodge, Whyte, Chapman, McAllister	12,964
26 October 1991	Oldham Athletic	H	1–0	Kilcline (own goal)	28,199
2 November 1991	Wimbledon	A	0–0	—	7,025
16 November 1991	Queens Park Rangers	H	2–0	Sterland, Wallace	27,087
24 November 1991	Aston Villa	A	4–1	Chapman (2), Sterland, Wallace	23,713
30 November 1991	Everton	H	1–0	Wallace	30,043
7 December 1991	Luton Town	A	2–0	Speed, Wallace	11,550
14 December 1991	Tottenham Hotspur	H	1–1	Speed	31,404
22 December 1991	Nottingham Forest	A	0–0	—	27,170
26 December 1991	Southampton	H	3–3	Hodge (2), Speed	22,805
29 December 1991	Manchester United	H	1–1	Sterland (pen)	32,638
1 January 1992	West Ham United	A	3–1	Chapman (2), McAllister	21,766
12 January 1992	Sheffield Wednesday	A	6–1	Dorigo, Chapman (3), Whitlow, Wallace	32,228
18 January 1992	Crystal Palace	H	1–1	Fairclough	27,717
1 February 1992	Notts County	H	3–0	Batty, Sterland, Wallace	27,224
8 February 1992	Oldham Athletic	A	0–2	—	18,409
23 February 1992	Everton	A	1–1	Shutt	19,248
29 February 1992	Luton Town	H	2–0	Cantona, Chapman	28,231
3 March 1992	Aston Villa	H	0–0	—	28,896
7 March 1992	Tottenham Hotspur	A	3–1	Newsome, McAllister, Wallace	27,622
11 March 1992	Queens Park Rangers	A	1–4	Speed	14,641
14 March 1992	Wimbledon	H	5–1	Cantona, Chapman (3), Wallace	26,760
22 March 1992	Arsenal	A	1–1	Chapman	27,844
28 March 1992	West Ham United	H	0–0	—	31,101
4 April 1992	Manchester City	A	0–4	—	30,239
11 April 1992	Chelsea	H	3–0	Cantona, Chapman, Wallace	31,363
18 April 1992	Liverpool	A	0–0	—	37,186
20 April 1992	Coventry City	H	2–0	Fairclough, McAllister (pen)	26,582
26 April 1992	Sheffield United	A	3–2	Gayle (own goal), Newsome, Wallace	32,000
2 May 1992	Norwich City	H	1–0	Wallace	32,673

=== FA Cup ===
Round	Date	Opponent	Venue	Result	Scorers	Attendance
Third round	5 January 1992	Manchester United	H	0–1	—	31,819

=== League Cup ===
Round	Date	Opponent	Venue	Result	Scorers	Attendance
Second round first leg	24 September 1991	Scunthorpe United	A	0–0	—	8,392
Second round second leg	8 October 1991	Scunthorpe United	H	3–0 (won 3–0 on agg)	Speed, Chapman, Sterland	14,558
Third round	29 October 1991	Tranmere Rovers	H	3–1	Shutt, Chapman (2)	18,266
Fourth round	4 December 1991	Everton	A	4–1	Speed 27', Chapman 39', Rod Wallace 54', 55'	25,467
Quarter-final	8 January 1992	Manchester United	H	1–3	Speed 17'	28,886

=== Full Members Cup ===
Round	Date	Opponent	Venue	Result	Goalscorers	Attendance
Second round	22 October 1991	Nottingham Forest	H	1–3	Rod Wallace	6,495

== Awards ==
At the end of the season, left-back Tony Dorigo was named the club's Player of the Year.
