= 1989–90 Leeds United A.F.C. season =

1989–1990 football season

Leeds United
1989–90 season
- Chairman: Leslie Silver
- Manager: Howard Wilkinson
- Stadium: Elland Road
- Second Division: 1st (promoted)
- FA Cup: Third round
- League Cup: Second round
- Full Members' Cup: Fourth round
- Top goalscorer: League: Gordon Strachan (16); All: Gordon Strachan (17)
- Highest home attendance: 32,727 vs Sheffield United (16 April 1990, Second Division)
- Lowest home attendance: 5,070 vs Blackburn Rovers (7 November 1989, Full Members' Cup)
- Average home league attendance: 28,568

The 1989–90 season, saw Leeds United competing in the Football League Second Division.

== Season summary ==
In the 1989–90 season, Leeds were promoted to the First Division, having finished as champions of the Second Division on 85 points.

== First team squad ==
Note: Flags indicate national team as defined under FIFA eligibility rules; some limited exceptions apply. Players may hold more than one non-FIFA nationality.

Pos.	Nation	Player
GK	ENG	Mervyn Day
GK	WAL	Neil Edwards
GK	ENG	Chris Turner
DF	ENG	Simon Grayson
DF	ENG	Chris Fairclough
DF	NIR	John McClelland
DF	ENG	Peter Haddock
DF	ENG	Chris O'Donnell
DF	ENG	Mel Sterland
DF	ENG	Mike Whitlow
DF	JAM	Noel Blake
DF	IRL	Jim Beglin
DF	ENG	Dylan Kerr
DF	ENG	Glynn Snodin
MF	ENG	Vince Hilaire

Pos.	Nation	Player
MF	WAL	Gary Speed
MF	ENG	David Batty
MF	WAL	Vinnie Jones
MF	ENG	Chris Kamara
MF	SCO	Gordon Strachan
MF	WAL	Mickey Thomas
MF	ENG	Andy Williams
FW	ENG	John Pearson
FW	ENG	Carl Shutt
FW	ENG	Bobby Davison
FW	ENG	Lee Chapman
FW	ENG	Ian Baird
FW	ENG	Imre Varadi
FW	SCO	John Hendrie

== Competitions ==
=== Football League Second Division ===
==== League table ====
Pos	Team	Pld	W	D	L	GF	GA	GD	Pts	Qualification or relegation
1	Leeds United (C, P)	46	24	13	9	79	52	+27	85	Promotion to the First Division
2	Sheffield United (P)	46	24	13	9	78	58	+20	85	Promotion to the First Division
3	Newcastle United	46	22	14	10	80	55	+25	80	Qualification for the Second Division play-offs
4	Swindon Town (Note: Swindon Town were disqualified from promotion after being found guilty of making illegal payments, and the play-off runners-up Sunderland were promoted in their place.) (O)	46	20	14	12	79	59	+20	74	Qualification for the Second Division play-offs
5	Blackburn Rovers	46	19	17	10	74	59	+15	74	Qualification for the Second Division play-offs

Source: Statto
Rules for classification: 1) Points; 2) Goal difference; 3) Goals scored
(C) Champions; (O) Play-off winners; (P) Promoted

==== Results ====
Win	Draw	Loss

Second Division match results
Date	Opponent	Venue	Result F–A	Scorers	Attendance
19 August 1989	Newcastle United	Away	2–5	Davison, Baird	24,482
23 August 1989	Middlesbrough	Home	2–1	Davison, Parkinson (o.g.)	25,004
26 August 1989	Blackburn Rovers	Home	1–1	Fairclough	25,045
2 September 1989	Stoke City	Away	1–1	Strachan	10,915
9 September 1989	Ipswich Town	Home	1–1	Jones	22,972
16 September 1989	Hull City	Away	1–0	Baird	11,620
23 September 1989	Swindon Town	Home	4–0	Strachan (3, 1 pen.), Davison	21,694
27 September 1989	Oxford United	Home	2–1	Davison, Sterland	24,097
30 September 1989	Port Vale	Away	0–0	—	11,156
7 October 1989	West Ham United	Away	1–0	Jones	23,539
14 October 1989	Sunderland	Home	2–0	Davison, Fairclough	27,815
17 October 1989	Portsmouth	Away	3–3	Davison, Whitlow, Sterland	10,260
21 October 1989	Wolverhampton Wanderers	Home	1–0	Davison	28,024
28 October 1989	Bradford City	Away	1–0	Davison	12,527
1 November 1989	Plymouth Argyle	Home	2–1	Strachan (pen.), Davison	26,791
4 November 1989	Bournemouth	Home	3–0	Baird, Strachan (pen.), Fairclough	26,484
11 November 1989	Leicester City	Away	3–4	Baird, Williams, Strachan (pen.)	18,032
18 November 1989	Watford	Home	2–1	Fairclough, Williams	26,921
25 November 1989	West Bromwich Albion	Away	1–2	Fairclough	15,116
2 December 1989	Newcastle United	Home	1–0	Baird	31,715
9 December 1989	Middlesbrough	Away	2–0	Shutt, Fairclough	19,686
16 December 1989	Brighton & Hove Albion	Home	3–0	Strachan, Hendrie, Jones	24,070
26 December 1989	Sheffield United	Away	2–2	Sterland, Shutt	31,254
30 December 1989	Barnsley	Away	0–1	—	14,481
1 January 1990	Oldham Athletic	Home	1–1	Hendrie	30,217
13 January 1990	Blackburn Rovers	Away	2–1	Chapman, Strachan	14,485
20 January 1990	Stoke City	Home	2–0	Strachan (pen.), Hendrie	29,318
4 February 1990	Swindon Town	Away	2–3	Strachan (pen.), Hendrie	16,208
10 February 1990	Hull City	Home	4–3	Hendrie, Jones, Varadi, Strachan	29,977
17 February 1990	Ipswich Town	Away	2–2	Chapman (2)	17,102
24 February 1990	West Bromwich Albion	Home	2–2	Kamara, Chapman	30,004
3 March 1990	Watford	Away	0–1	—	13,468
7 March 1990	Port Vale	Home	0–0	—	28,756
10 March 1990	Oxford United	Away	4–2	Chapman (2), Varadi, Fairclough	8,397
17 March 1990	West Ham United	Home	3–2	Chapman (2), Strachan	32,536
20 March 1990	Sunderland	Away	1–0	Sterland	17,851
24 March 1990	Portsmouth	Home	2–0	Jones, Chapman	27,600
31 March 1990	Wolverhampton Wanderers	Away	0–1	—	22,419
7 April 1990	Bradford City	Home	1–1	Speed	32,316
10 April 1990	Plymouth Argyle	Away	1–1	Chapman	11,382
13 April 1990	Oldham Athletic	Away	1–3	Davison	16,292
16 April 1990	Sheffield United	Home	4–0	Strachan (2, 1 (pen.)), Chapman, Speed	32,727
21 April 1990	Brighton & Hove Albion	Away	2–2	Speed, Chapman (o.g.)	11,359
25 April 1990	Barnsley	Home	1–2	Fairclough	31,700
28 April 1990	Leicester City	Home	2–1	Sterland, Strachan	32,597
5 May 1990	Bournemouth	Away	1–0	Chapman	9,918

=== FA Cup ===
Win	Draw	Loss

FA Cup match results
Round	Date	Opponent	Venue	Result F–A	Scorers	Attendance
Third round	6 January 1990	Ipswich Town	Home	0–1	—	26,766

=== League Cup ===
Win	Draw	Loss

League Cup match results
Round	Date	Opponent	Venue	Result F–A	Scorers	Attendance
Second round first leg	19 September 1989	Oldham Athletic	Away	1–2	Strachan	8,415
Second round second leg	3 October 1989	Oldham Athletic	Home	1–2 (Note: Leeds United lost 4–2 on aggregate)	Fairclough	18,092

=== Full Members' Cup ===
Win	Draw	Loss

Full Members' Cup match results
Round	Date	Opponent	Venue	Result F–A	Scorers	Attendance
First round	7 November 1989	Blackburn Rovers	Home	1–0	Davison	5,070
Second round	28 November 1989	Barnsley	Away	2–1	Strachan (pen.), Williams	6,136
Third round	19 December 1989	Stoke City	Away	2–2 (Note: Leeds United win 5–4 on penalties)	Shutt (2)	5,792
Fourth round	17 January 1990	Aston Villa	Away	0–2	—	17,543
