= 1992–93 Leeds United A.F.C. season =

1992–93 season of Leeds United

Leeds United
1992–93 season
- Chairman: Leslie Silver
- Manager: Howard Wilkinson
- Stadium: Elland Road
- Premier League: 17th
- FA Cup: Fourth round
- League Cup: Third round
- FA Charity Shield: Winners
- Champions League: Second round
- Top goalscorer: League: Lee Chapman (14); All: Lee Chapman (18)
- Highest home attendance: 34,166 vs Manchester United (8 February 1993, Premier League)
- Lowest home attendance: 10,113 vs Scunthorpe United (22 September 1992, League Cup)
- Average home league attendance: 27,585

The 1992–93 season saw Leeds United competing in the Premier League (known as the FA Premier League for sponsorship reasons) and the UEFA Champions League.

== Competitions ==
=== Premier League ===
==== League table ====
Pos	Team	Pld	W	D	L	GF	GA	GD	Pts
15	Coventry City	42	13	13	16	52	57	−5	52
16	Ipswich Town	42	12	16	14	50	55	−5	52
17	Leeds United	42	12	15	15	57	62	−5	51
18	Southampton	42	13	11	18	54	61	−7	50
19	Oldham Athletic	42	13	10	19	63	74	−11	49

Source: Premier League
Rules for classification: 1) points; 2) goal difference; 3) number of goals scored.

==== Results summary ====
Overall								Home						Away					
Pld	W	D	L	GF	GA	GD	Pts	W	D	L	GF	GA	GD	W	D	L	GF	GA	GD
42	12	15	15	57	62	−5	51	12	8	1	40	17	+23	0	7	14	17	45	−28

Source: Statto

==== Results by round ====
Round	1	2	3	4	5	6	7	8	9	10	11	12	13	14	15	16	17	18	19	20	21	22	23	24	25	26	27	28	29	30	31	32	33	34	35	36	37	38	39	40	41	42
Ground	H	A	A	H	H	A	A	H	A	H	A	H	A	H	A	H	A	H	H	A	A	H	H	A	H	A	H	H	A	A	H	H	A	H	A	H	A	H	A	H	A	A
Result	W	D	L	W	D	D	L	D	D	W	L	W	L	D	L	W	L	L	W	L	L	D	W	L	W	L	D	W	L	D	W	W	D	D	L	W	L	D	L	D	D	D
Position	3	7	10	5	7	8	11	11	12	8	10	8	10	12	14	13	13	15	14	14	16	16	14	15	16	15	15	17	15	16	15	16	16	17	16	17	17	15	15	16	14	17

Source: Statto.com
A = Away; H = Home; W = Win; D = Draw; L = Loss

==== Matches ====
Date	Opponent	Venue	Result	Scorers	Attendance
15 August 1992	Wimbledon	H	2–1	Chapman (2)	25,795
19 August 1992	Aston Villa	A	1–1	Speed	29,151
22 August 1992	Middlesbrough	A	1–4	Cantona	18,649
25 August 1992	Tottenham Hotspur	H	5–0	Wallace, Cantona (3), Chapman	28,218
29 August 1992	Liverpool	H	2–2	McAllister, Chapman	29,597
1 September 1992	Oldham Athletic	A	2–2	Cantona (2)	13,848
6 September 1992	Manchester United	A	0–2	—	31,296
13 September 1992	Aston Villa	H	1–1	Hodge	27,817
19 September 1992	Southampton	A	1–1	Speed	16,229
26 September 1992	Everton	H	2–0	McAllister, Chapman	27,915
3 October 1992	Ipswich Town	A	2–4	Chapman, Speed	21,200
17 October 1992	Sheffield United	H	3–1	Chapman, Speed, Whyte	29,706
24 October 1992	Queens Park Rangers	A	1–2	Strachan	19,326
31 October 1992	Coventry City	H	2–2	Chapman, Fairclough	28,018
7 November 1992	Manchester City	A	0–4	—	27,255
21 November 1992	Arsenal	H	3–0	Fairclough, Chapman, McAllister	30,516
29 November 1992	Chelsea	A	0–1	—	24,345
5 December 1992	Nottingham Forest	H	1–4	Speed	29,364
12 December 1992	Sheffield Wednesday	H	3–1	Speed, Chapman, Varadi	29,770
20 December 1992	Crystal Palace	A	0–1	—	14,462
26 December 1992	Blackburn Rovers	A	1–3	McAllister	19,910
28 December 1992	Norwich City	H	0–0	—	30,282
9 January 1993	Southampton	H	2–1	Chapman, Speed	26,071
16 January 1993	Everton	A	0–2	—	21,031
30 January 1993	Middlesbrough	H	3–0	Strandli, Batty, Fairclough	30,344
6 February 1993	Wimbledon	A	0–1	—	6,704
8 February 1993	Manchester United	H	0–0	—	34,166
13 February 1993	Oldham Athletic	H	2–0	McAllister, Chapman	27,654
20 February 1993	Tottenham Hotspur	A	0–4	—	32,040
24 February 1993	Arsenal	A	0–0	—	21,061
27 February 1993	Ipswich Town	H	1–0	Dorigo	28,848
13 March 1993	Manchester City	H	1–0	Rocastle	30,840
21 March 1993	Nottingham Forest	A	1–1	Wallace	25,148
24 March 1993	Chelsea	H	1–1	Wetherall	28,135
6 April 1993	Sheffield United	A	1–2	Strandli	20,562
10 April 1993	Blackburn Rovers	H	5–2	Strachan (3), Wallace, Chapman	31,789
14 April 1993	Norwich City	A	2–4	Chapman, Wallace	18,613
17 April 1993	Crystal Palace	H	0–0	—	27,545
21 April 1993	Liverpool	A	0–2	—	34,992
1 May 1993	Queens Park Rangers	H	1–1	Hodge	31,408
4 May 1993	Sheffield Wednesday	A	1–1	King (own goal)	26,855
8 May 1993	Coventry City	A	3–3	Wallace (3)	19,591

=== FA Charity Shield ===
Date	Opponent	Venue	Result	Scorers	Attendance
8 August 1992	Liverpool	N	4–3	Dorigo, Cantona (3)	61,291

=== FA Cup ===
Round	Date	Opponent	Venue	Result	Scorers	Attendance
Third Round	2 January 1993	Charlton Athletic	H	1–1	Speed	21,287
Third Round Replay	13 January 1993	Charlton Athletic	A	3–1	Garland (own goal), Speed, McAllister	8,337
Fourth Round	25 January 1993	Arsenal	A	2–2	Speed, Chapman	26,516
Fourth Round Replay	3 February 1993	Arsenal	H	2–3 (a.e.t.)	Shutt, McAllister	26,449

=== League Cup ===
Round	Date	Opponent	Venue	Result	Scorers	Attendance
Second Round First-Leg	22 September 1992	Scunthorpe United	H	4–1	Shutt, Speed, Chapman, Strachan	10,113
Second Round Second-Leg	27 October 1992	Scunthorpe United	A	2–2	Chapman, Rod Wallace	7,419
Third Round	10 November 1992	Watford	A	1–2	McAllister	18,035

=== UEFA Champions League ===
Round	Date	Opponent	Venue	Result	Scorers	Attendance
First Round First-Leg	16 September 1992	VfB Stuttgart	A	0–3	—	38,000
First Round Second-Leg	30 September 1992	VfB Stuttgart	H	4–1	Speed, Cantona, Chapman, McAllister (pen)	20,457
First Round Replay	9 October 1992	VfB Stuttgart	N	2–1	Shutt, Strachan	7,400
Second Round First-Leg	21 October 1992	Rangers	A	1–2	McAllister	43,251
Second Round Second-Leg	4 November 1992	Rangers	H	1–2	Cantona	25,118

== Statistics ==
=== Appearances and goals ===
No.	Pos	Nat	Player	Total		Premier League		Charity Shield		FA Cup		League Cup		UEFA Champions League	
No.	Pos	Nat	Player	Apps	Goals	Apps	Goals	Apps	Goals	Apps	Goals	Apps	Goals	Apps	Goals
Goalkeepers
	GK	(England) ENG	John Lukic	40	0	39	0	1	0	0	0	0	0	0	0
	GK	(England) ENG	Mervyn Day	2	0	2	0	0	0	0	0	0	0	0	0
	GK	(England) ENG	Mark Beeney	1	0	1	0	0	0	0	0	0	0	0	0
Defenders
	DF	(England) ENG	Chris Whyte	35	1	34	1	1	0	0	0	0	0	0	0
	DF	(England) ENG	Tony Dorigo	44	2	33	1	1	1	4	0	1	0	5	0
	DF	(England) ENG	Jon Newsome	38	0	30+7	0	1	0	0	0	0	0	0	0
	DF	(England) ENG	Chris Fairclough	31	4	29+1	4	1	0	0	0	0	0	0	0
	DF	(England) ENG	David Wetherall	13	1	13	1	0	0	0	0	0	0	0	0
	DF	(England) ENG	David Kerslake	8	0	8	0	0	0	0	0	0	0	0	0
	DF	(England) ENG	Ray Wallace	6	0	5+1	0	0	0	0	0	0	0	0	0
	DF	(England) ENG	Kevin Sharp	4	0	4	0	0	0	0	0	0	0	0	0
	DF	(England) ENG	Rob Bowman	4	0	3+1	0	0	0	0	0	0	0	0	0
	DF	(England) ENG	Dylan Kerr	5	0	3+2	0	0	0	0	0	0	0	0	0
	DF	(England) ENG	Mel Sterland	3	0	3	0	0	0	0	0	0	0	0	0
Midfielders
	MF	(Wales) WAL	Gary Speed	52	12	39	7	1	0	4	3	3	1	5	1
	MF	(Scotland) SCO	Gary McAllister	33	10	32	5	1	0	0	2	0	1	0	2
	MF	(England) ENG	David Batty	31	1	30	1	1	0	0	0	0	0	0	0
	MF	(Scotland) SCO	Gordon Strachan	44	6	25+6	4	0+1	0	4	0	3	1	5	1
	MF	(England) ENG	David Rocastle	18	1	11+7	1	0	0	0	0	0	0	0	0
	MF	(England) ENG	Steve Hodge	24	2	9+14	2	0+1	0	0	0	0	0	0	0
	MF	(England) ENG	Mark Tinkler	7	0	5+2	0	0	0	0	0	0	0	0	0
Forwards
	FW	(England) ENG	Lee Chapman	53	17	36+4	13	1	0	4	1	3	2	5	1
	FW	(England) ENG	Rod Wallace	33	8	31+1	7	1	0	0	0	0	1	0	0
	FW	(England) ENG	Carl Shutt	14	3	6+8	0	0	0	0	1	0	1	0	1
	FW	(England) ENG	Jamie Forrester	6	0	5+1	0	0	0	0	0	0	0	0	0
	FW	(Norway) NOR	Frank Strandli	10	2	5+5	2	0	0	0	0	0	0	0	0
	FW	(England) ENG	Imre Varadi	4	1	2+2	1	0	0	0	0	0	0	0	0
	FW	(England) ENG	Noel Whelan	1	0	1	0	0	0	0	0	0	0	0	0
Players transferred out during the season
	FW	(France) FRA	Eric Cantona	20	11	12+1	6	1	3	0	0	1	0	5	2
	MF	(England) ENG	Scott Sellars	7	0	6+1	0	0	0	0	0	0	0	0	0

Last updated: 31 June 1993
Source: Competitions

== Transfers ==
=== In ===
Date	Pos.	Name	From	Fee
1 July 1992	MF	(England) Scott Sellars	(England) Blackburn Rovers	£800,000
23 July 1992	MF	(England) David Rocastle	(England) Arsenal	£2,000,000
20 October 1992	FW	(England) Jamie Forrester	(France) Auxerre	Undisclosed
20 October 1992	DF	(England) Kevin Sharp	(France) Auxerre	£60,000
20 January 1993	FW	(Norway) Frank Strandli	(Norway) IK Start	£250,000
9 March 1993	DF	(England) David Kerslake	(England) Swindon Town	£500,000
22 April 1993	GK	(England) Mark Beeney	(England) Brighton & Hove Albion	£350,000

=== Out ===
Date	Pos.	Name	To	Fee
1 August 1992	FW	(England) Bobby Davison	(England) Leicester City	£50,000
12 November 1992	FW	(France) Eric Cantona	(England) Manchester United	£1,200,000
9 March 1993	MF	(England) Scott Sellars	(England) Newcastle United	£700,000
