= 1987–88 Leeds United A.F.C. season =

Leeds United
1987–88 season
- Chairman: Leslie Silver
- Manager: Billy Bremner
- Stadium: Elland Road
- Second Division: 7th
- FA Cup: Third round
- League Cup: Third round
- Full Members' Cup: Second round

The 1987–88 season was Leeds United's 61st season in the Football League, and their sixth consecutive season in the Football League Second Division, the second tier of English football, where they finished 7th. The club also competed in the FA Cup, where they were eliminated in the third round, and the Football League Cup, also eliminated in the third round, and the Full Members' Cup, where they were eliminated in the second round.

== Competitions ==
=== Second Division ===
==== League table ====
Pos	Team	Pld	W	D	L	GF	GA	GD	Pts	Relegation
5	Blackburn Rovers	44	21	14	9	68	52	+16	77	Qualification for the Second Division play-offs
6	Crystal Palace	44	22	9	13	86	59	+27	75	
7	Leeds United	44	19	12	13	61	51	+10	69	
8	Ipswich Town	44	19	9	16	61	52	+9	66	
9	Manchester City	44	19	8	17	80	60	+20	65	

Rules for classification: 1) Points; 2) Goal difference; 3) Goals scored

==== Matches ====
Win	Draw	Loss

Second Division match results
Date	Opponent	Venue	Result F–A	Scorers	Attendance	League position
16 August 1987	Barnsley	Away	1–1	Taylor	9,778	10th
19 August 1987	Leicester City	Home	1–0	Sheridan (pen.)	21,034	2nd
22 August 1987	Reading	Home	0–0		19,286	4th
29 August 1987	Bradford City	Away	0–0		11,428	9th
31 August 1987	West Bromwich Albion	Home	1–0	Sheridan	19,847	3rd
5 September 1987	Ipswich Town	Away	0–1		11,163	8th
12 September 1987	Hull City	Home	0–2		18,205	12th
15 September 1987	Huddersfield Town	Away	0–0		9,085	12th
19 September 1987	Middlesbrough	Away	0–2		12,051	16th
26 September 1987	Manchester City	Home	2–0	DeMange, G. Snodin	25,358	11th
30 September 1987	Stoke City	Home	0–0		17,208	11th
3 October 1987	Blackburn Rovers	Away	1–1	Taylor	7,675	12th
10 October 1987	Aston Villa	Home	1–3	Taylor	20,741	14th
17 October 1987	Plymouth Argyle	Away	3–6	Taylor, G. Snodin (2)	9,358	16th
20 October 1987	Oldham Athletic	Away	1–1	Swan	6,312	16th
24 October 1987	AFC Bournemouth	Home	3–2	Taylor, Swan, Rennie	15,253	13th
31 October 1987	Sheffield United	Away	2–2	G. Snodin, Swan	12,095	14th
7 November 1987	Shrewsbury Town	Home	2–1	Stiles, Taylor	13,760	13th
14 November 1987	Millwall	Away	1–3	McLeary (o.g.)	8,014	13th
21 November 1987	Swindon Town	Home	4–2	Rennie, Davison, Taylor, Haddock	15,457	12th
28 November 1987	Crystal Palace	Away	0–3		8,749	13th
5 December 1987	Birmingham City	Home	4–1	Sheridan (pen.), Davison, Swan, Taylor	15,977	13th
12 December 1987	Reading	Away	1–0	Sheridan (pen.)	6,505	12th
19 December 1987	Huddersfield Town	Home	3–0	Sheridan (2), Davison	20,111	11th
26 December 1987	Manchester City	Away	2–1	Redmond (o.g.), Batty	30,153	10th
28 December 1987	Middlesbrough	Home	2–0	Davison, Swan	34,186	10th
1 January 1988	Bradford City	Home	2–0	G. Williams, G. Snodin	36,004	9th
3 January 1988	Hull City	Away	1–3	Swan	14,694	9th
16 January 1988	Barnsley	Home	0–2		19,028	9th
30 January 1988	West Bromwich Albion	Away	4–1	Sheridan, G. Williams, Pearson, Davison	9,008	8th
6 February 1988	Ipswich Town	Home	1–0	Pearson	19,564	7th
13 February 1988	Leicester City	Away	2–3	G. Williams, Sheridan (pen.)	11,937	7th
23 February 1988	Stoke City	Away	1–2	Pearson	10,129	7th
27 February 1988	Blackburn Rovers	Home	2–2	Sheridan (pen.), G. Snodin	23,843	7th
5 March 1988	Plymouth Argyle	Home	1–0	Baird	18,115	7th
12 March 1988	Aston Villa	Away	2–1	Swan, Taylor	19,677	7th
19 March 1988	Sheffield United	Home	5–0	Swan, Pearson (3), Sheridan	22,376	7th
26 March 1988	AFC Bournemouth	Away	0–0		9,147	6th
2 April 1988	Shrewsbury Town	Away	0–1		7,369	7th
6 April 1988	Millwall	Home	1–2	Sheridan (pen.)	24,241	7th
23 April 1988	Oldham Athletic	Home	1–1	G. Snodin	13,442	7th
30 April 1988	Swindon Town	Away	2–1	Baird (2)	8,299	7th
2 May 1988	Crystal Palace	Home	1–0	Sheridan (pen.)	13,217	7th
6 May 1988	Birmingham City	Away	0–0		6,024	7th

=== FA Cup ===
FA Cup match details
Round	Date	Opponent	Venue	Result F–A	Scorers	Attendance
Third round	9 January 1988	Aston Villa	Home	1–2	Davison	29,002

=== League Cup ===
League Cup match details
Round	Date	Opponent	Venue	Result F–A	Scorers	Attendance
Second round, first leg	23 September 1987	York City	Home	1–1	G. Snodin	11,527
Second round, second leg	6 October 1987	York City	Away	4–0	Sheridan (2), Taylor, Mumby	5,996
Third round	28 October 1987	Oldham Athletic	Home	2–2	Swan (2)	15,600
Third round replay	4 November 1987	Oldham Athletic	Away	2–4 (a.e.t.)	G. Snodin, Taylor	7,058

=== Full Members' Cup ===
Full Members' Cup match details
Round	Date	Opponent	Venue	Result F–A	Scorers	Attendance
First round	25 November 1987	Sheffield United	Home	3–0	Rennie, Taylor, Noteman	4,425
Second round	8 December 1987	Millwall	Away	0–2		5,034
