= 1988–89 Leeds United A.F.C. season =

1988–1989 season of Leeds United

Leeds United
1988–89 season
- Chairman: Leslie Silver
- Manager: Billy Bremner (until 28 September); Peter Gunby (caretaker, until 10 Oct); Howard Wilkinson (from 12 October)
- Stadium: Elland Road
- Second Division: 10th
- FA Cup: Fourth round
- League Cup: Third round
- Full Members' Cup: Second round
- Top goalscorer: League: Bobby Davison (14); All: Bobby Davison (17)
- Highest home attendance: 33,325 vs Bradford City (1 March 1989, Second Division)
- Lowest home attendance: 3,220 vs Shrewsbury Town (9 November 1989, Full Members' Cup)
- Average home league attendance: 21,811

The 1988–89 season saw Leeds United competing in the Football League Second Division.

== Season summary ==
Following two seasons in and just outside of the promotion play-off places, Leeds made a poor start to the season, taking six points from the first six games. A League Cup victory against Peterborough United was not enough to prevent manager and former team captain Billy Bremner from being sacked. Howard Wilkinson was appointed as the new manager on 10 October after a brief caretaker stint by Peter Gunby.

Leeds rose to mid-table by December and sat in 6th by mid-February, losing only two league matches in that time. The turnaround stalled in late February and early March as a winless streak saw the team fall back to 12th in the league table. Wilkinson brought Gordon Strachan, Chris Fairclough, and Carl Shutt into the lineup, and Leeds climbed the table back to 6th by 1 April. Although these new players would be involved in the successes of subsequent years, this season's resurgence did not last, and Leeds took just 11 points from the last eight games to finish the campaign in 10th.

== Competitions ==
=== Football League Second Division ===
==== League table ====
| Pos | Team | Pld | W | D | L | GF | GA | GD | Pts |
|---|---|---|---|---|---|---|---|---|---|
| 8 | Ipswich Town | 46 | 22 | 7 | 17 | 71 | 61 | +10 | 73 |
| 9 | West Bromwich Albion | 46 | 18 | 18 | 10 | 65 | 41 | +24 | 72 |
| 10 | Leeds United | 46 | 17 | 16 | 13 | 59 | 50 | +9 | 67 |
| 11 | Sunderland | 46 | 16 | 15 | 15 | 60 | 60 | 0 | 63 |
| 12 | Bournemouth | 46 | 18 | 8 | 20 | 53 | 62 | −9 | 62 |

Source: thestatcat.co.uk
Rules for classification: 1) Points; 2) Goal difference; 3) Goals scored

==== Results ====
| Win | Draw | Loss |

Second Division match details
| Date | Opponent | Venue | Result F–A | Scorers | Attendance | Position |
|---|---|---|---|---|---|---|
| 27 August 1988 | Oxford United | Home | 1–1 | Snodin | 22,038 | 11 |
| 3 September 1988 | Portsmouth | Away | 0–4 | — | 15,263 | 21 |
| 10 September 1988 | Manchester City | Home | 1–1 | Blake | 23,677 | 21 |
| 17 September 1988 | Bournemouth | Away | 0–0 | — | 7,922 | 19 |
| 21 September 1988 | Barnsley | Home | 2–0 | Davison, Hilaire | 17,370 | 17 |
| 24 September 1988 | Chelsea | Home | 0–2 | — | 26,080 | 18 |
| 1 October 1988 | Brighton & Hove Albion | Away | 1–2 | Baird | 7,109 | 21 |
| 4 October 1988 | Sunderland | Away | 1–2 | Davison | 12,671 | 21 |
| 8 October 1988 | Watford | Home | 0–1 | — | 15,657 | 21 |
| 16 October 1988 | Swindon Town | Away | 0–0 | — | 9,234 | 21 |
| 22 October 1988 | Leicester City | Home | 1–1 | Hilaire | 17,263 | 21 |
| 26 October 1988 | Bradford City | Away | 1–1 | Davison | 13,048 | 21 |
| 29 October 1988 | Hull City | Home | 2–1 | Baird, Sheridan | 17,536 | 21 |
| 5 November 1988 | Ipswich Town | Away | 1–0 | Sheridan (pen) | 11,750 | 20 |
| 12 November 1988 | West Bromwich Albion | Home | 2–1 | Baird, Aizlewood | 20,442 | 19 |
| 19 November 1988 | Oldham Athletic | Away | 2–2 | Davison (2) | 8,824 | 20 |
| 22 November 1988 | Birmingham City | Away | 0–0 | — | 6,168 | 19 |
| 26 November 1988 | Stoke City | Home | 4–0 | Baird (2), Davison, Sheridan (pen) | 19,933 | 14 |
| 3 December 1988 | Walsall | Away | 3–0 | Davison (2), Whitlow | 6,885 | 11 |
| 10 December 1988 | Shrewsbury Town | Home | 2–3 | Davison, Sheridan (pen) | 19,967 | 14 |
| 17 December 1988 | Crystal Palace | Away | 0–0 | — | 9,847 | 14 |
| 26 December 1988 | Blackburn Rovers | Home | 2–0 | Baird, Davison | 31,622 | 11 |
| 31 December 1988 | Plymouth Argyle | Home | 2–0 | Baird, Snodin | 24,043 | 11 |
| 2 January 1989 | Manchester City | Away | 0–0 | — | 33,034 | 11 |
| 14 January 1989 | Birmingham City | Home | 1–0 | Hilaire | 21,937 | 7 |
| 21 January 1989 | Oxford United | Away | 2–3 | Blake, Hilaire | 7,928 | 11 |
| 4 February 1989 | Sunderland | Home | 2–0 | Davison, Sheridan (pen) | 31,985 | 8 |
| 11 February 1989 | Watford | Away | 1–1 | Pearson | 13,439 | 9 |
| 18 February 1989 | Leicester City | Away | 2–1 | Snodin, Davison | 14,151 | 6 |
| 25 February 1989 | Swindon Town | Home | 0–0 | — | 22,651 | 8 |
| 1 March 1989 | Bradford City | Home | 3–3 | Baird, Blake, Hilaire | 33,325 | 8 |
| 5 March 1989 | West Bromwich Albion | Away | 1–2 | Adams | 15,914 | 10 |
| 11 March 1989 | Ipswich Town | Home | 2–4 | Blake, Hilaire | 19,639 | 12 |
| 14 March 1989 | Hull City | Away | 2–1 | Baird, Davison | 8,887 | 10 |
| 19 March 1989 | Barnsley | Away | 2–2 | Aizlewood, Sheridan (pen) | 11,578 | 10 |
| 25 March 1989 | Portsmouth | Home | 1–0 | Baird | 27,049 | 8 |
| 27 March 1989 | Blackburn Rovers | Away | 0–2 | — | 11,533 | 10 |
| 1 April 1989 | Bournemouth | Home | 3–0 | Shutt (3) | 21,095 | 6 |
| 5 April 1989 | Crystal Palace | Home | 1–2 | Shutt | 25,604 | 9 |
| 9 April 1989 | Plymouth Argyle | Away | 0–1 | — | 9,365 | 10 |
| 15 April 1989 | Brighton & Hove Albion | Home | 1–0 | Williams | 14,915 | 7 |
| 22 April 1989 | Chelsea | Away | 0–1 | — | 30,337 | 10 |
| 29 April 1989 | Stoke City | Away | 3–2 | Davison, Strachan, Sheridan (pen) | 9,051 | 10 |
| 1 May 1989 | Walsall | Home | 1–0 | Aizlewood | 13,280 | 10 |
| 6 May 1989 | Oldham Athletic | Home | 0–0 | — | 14,459 | 10 |
| 13 May 1989 | Shrewsbury Town | Away | 3–3 | Rennie, Strachan (2) | 4,693 | 10 |

=== FA Cup ===
| Win | Draw | Loss |

FA Cup match details
| Round | Date | Opponent | Venue | Result F–A | Scorers | Attendance |
|---|---|---|---|---|---|---|
| Third round | 7 January 1989 | Brighton & Hove Albion | Away | 2–1 | Baird (2) | 10,900 |
| Fourth round | 28 January 1989 | Nottingham Forest | Away | 0–2 | — | 28,107 |

=== League Cup ===
| Win | Draw | Loss |

League Cup match details
| Round | Date | Opponent | Venue | Result F–A | Scorers | Attendance |
|---|---|---|---|---|---|---|
| Second round first leg | 27 September 1988 | Peterborough United | Away | 2–1 | Snodin, Baird | 4,979 |
| Second round second leg | 12 October 1988 | Peterborough United | Home | 3–1 (5–2 agg.) | Davison, Hilaire, Sheridan (pen.) | 8,894 |
| Third round | 2 November 1988 | Luton Town | Home | 0–2 | — | 19,447 |

=== Full Members' Cup ===
| Win | Draw | Loss |

Full Members' Cup match details
| Round | Date | Opponent | Venue | Result F–A | Scorers | Attendance |
|---|---|---|---|---|---|---|
| First round | 9 November 1988 | Shrewsbury Town | Home | 3–1 | Davison (2), Aizlewood | 3,220 |
| Second round | 29 November 1988 | Millwall | Away | 0–2 | — | 4,242 |

== First team squad ==
Note: Flags indicate national team as defined under FIFA eligibility rules; some limited exceptions apply. Players may hold more than one non-FIFA nationality.

| Pos. | Nation | Player |
|---|---|---|
| GK | ENG | Mervyn Day |
| GK | ENG | Ian Andrews |
| GK | WAL | Neil Edwards |
| DF | WAL | Mark Aizlewood (captain) |
| DF | ENG | Mickey Adams |
| DF | SCO | Jack Ashurst |
| DF | ENG | Neil Aspin |
| DF | ENG | Brendan Ormsby |
| DF | ENG | Simon Grayson |
| DF | ENG | Chris Fairclough |
| DF | ENG | Peter Haddock |
| DF | ENG | Mike Whitlow |
| DF | ENG | Gary Williams |
| DF | SCO | David Rennie |
| DF | JAM | Noel Blake |
| DF | ENG | Dylan Kerr |

| Pos. | Nation | Player |
|---|---|---|
| DF | ENG | Glynn Snodin |
| DF | ENG | Peter Swan |
| MF | ENG | David Batty |
| MF | ENG | Vince Hilaire |
| MF | IRL | John Sheridan |
| MF | WAL | Gary Speed |
| MF | ENG | John Stiles |
| MF | SCO | Gordon Strachan (captain) |
| MF | WAL | Mickey Thomas |
| MF | ENG | Andy Williams |
| FW | ENG | Ian Baird |
| FW | ENG | Bobby Davison |
| FW | ENG | Peter Mumby |
| FW | ENG | John Pearson |
| FW | ENG | Carl Shutt |
| FW | ENG | Bob Taylor |

== Transfers ==
=== Transfers in ===
| Player | From club | Transfer fee |
|---|---|---|
| Vince Hilaire | Portsmouth | £190,000 |
| Noel Blake | Portsmouth | Free |
| Andy Williams | Rotherham United | £175,000 |
| Gordon Strachan | Manchester United | £300,000 |
| Chris Fairclough | Tottenham Hotspur | £500,000 |
| Carl Shutt | Bristol City | £50,000 |

=== Transfers out ===
| Player | To club | Transfer fee |
|---|---|---|
| Bobby McDonald | V.S. Rugby | Free |
| Vince Brockie | Doncaster Rovers | £15,000 |
| Jack Ashurst | Doncaster Rovers | £10,000 |
| Mickey Adams | Southampton | £250,000 |
| Peter Swan | Hull City | £200,000 |
| Bob Taylor | Bristol City | £175,000 |

=== Loaned in ===
| Player | From club |
|---|---|
| Ian Andrews | Celtic |

=== Loaned out ===
| Player | To club |
|---|---|
| Ronnie Sinclair | Halifax Town |

Source: leeds-fans.org
