= 1993–94 Leeds United A.F.C. season =

1993–94 season of Leeds United

Leeds United
1993–94 season
- Chairman: Leslie Silver
- Manager: Howard Wilkinson
- Stadium: Elland Road
- Premier League: 5th
- FA Cup: Fourth round
- League Cup: Second round
- Top goalscorer: League: Rod Wallace (17); All: Rod Wallace (17)
- Highest home attendance: 41,125 vs Manchester United (27 April 1994, Premier League)
- Lowest home attendance: 22,167 vs Oxford United (9 February 1994, FA Cup)
- Average home league attendance: 34,493

The 1993–94 season saw Leeds United competing in the Premier League (known as the FA Carling Premiership for sponsorship reasons) for a second successive season.

== Competitions ==
=== Premier League ===
==== League table ====
Pos	Team	Pld	W	D	L	GF	GA	GD	Pts	Qualification or relegation
3	Newcastle United	42	23	8	11	82	41	+41	77	Qualification for the UEFA Cup first round
4	Arsenal	42	18	17	7	53	28	+25	71	Qualification for the Cup Winners' Cup first round (Note: Arsenal qualified for the Cup Winners' Cup as the defending champions.)
5	Leeds United	42	18	16	8	65	39	+26	70	
6	Wimbledon	42	18	11	13	56	53	+3	65	
7	Sheffield Wednesday	42	16	16	10	76	54	+22	64	

Source: Premier League
Rules for classification: 1) points; 2) goal difference; 3) number of goals scored.

==== Results summary ====
Overall								Home						Away					
Pld	W	D	L	GF	GA	GD	Pts	W	D	L	GF	GA	GD	W	D	L	GF	GA	GD
42	18	16	8	65	39	+26	70	13	6	2	37	18	+19	5	10	6	28	21	+7

Source: Statto

==== Results by round ====
Round	1	2	3	4	5	6	7	8	9	10	11	12	13	14	15	16	17	18	19	20	21	22	23	24	25	26	27	28	29	30	31	32	33	34	35	36	37	38	39	40	41	42
Ground	A	H	H	A	A	H	A	H	A	H	A	H	A	H	A	A	H	H	A	A	H	A	H	A	H	A	A	H	A	H	A	H	H	A	H	A	H	A	H	H	H	A
Result	D	W	L	L	L	W	W	W	W	W	D	D	D	W	D	D	W	W	W	L	W	D	D	D	D	L	L	W	D	D	D	W	W	L	D	W	W	D	L	W	D	W
Position	11	8	12	17	18	14	12	9	5	3	4	4	6	4	5	6	2	2	2	2	2	2	3	5	5	6	7	6	6	7	8	5	5	5	5	5	5	5	5	5	5	5

Source: Statto.com
A = Away; H = Home; W = Win; D = Draw; L = Loss

=== Premier League ===
Date	Opponent	Venue	Result	Scorers	Attendance
14 August 1993	Manchester City	A	1–1	Deane	32,366
17 August 1993	West Ham United	H	1–0	Speed	34,588
21 August 1993	Norwich City	H	0–4	—	32,008
24 August 1993	Arsenal	A	1–2	Strachan	29,042
28 August 1993	Liverpool	A	0–2	—	44,068
30 August 1993	Oldham Athletic	H	1–0	Strachan	28,717
11 September 1993	Southampton	A	2–0	Deane, Speed	13,511
19 September 1993	Sheffield United	H	2–1	Strachan, McAllister	33,892
25 September 1993	Coventry City	A	2–0	Wallace (2)	28,717
2 October 1993	Wimbledon	H	4–0	Speed (2), McAllister (2)	30,020
17 October 1993	Ipswich Town	A	0–0	—	17,548
23 October 1993	Blackburn Rovers	H	3–3	Sherwood (o.g.), Newsome, McAllister (pen.)	37,827
30 October 1993	Sheffield Wednesday	A	3–3	Speed, Fairclough, Wallace	31,892
6 November 1993	Chelsea	H	4–1	Deane, Rocastle, Wallace (2)	35,022
20 November 1993	Tottenham Hotspur	A	1–1	Deane	31,275
23 November 1993	Everton	A	1–1	Wallace	17,066
27 November 1993	Swindon Town	H	3–0	Deane, Speed, Wallace	32,630
4 December 1993	Manchester City	H	3–2	Deane, Speed, Wallace	33,821
8 December 1993	West Ham United	A	1–0	Wallace	20,468
13 December 1993	Norwich City	A	1–2	Wallace	16,586
18 December 1993	Arsenal	H	2–1	Adams (o.g.), McAllister	37,515
22 December 1993	Newcastle United	A	1–1	Fairclough	36,388
29 December 1993	Queens Park Rangers	H	1–1	Hodge	39,106
1 January 1994	Manchester United	A	0–0	—	44,724
15 January 1994	Ipswich Town	H	0–0	—	31,317
23 January 1994	Blackburn Rovers	A	1–2	Speed	16,938
6 February 1994	Aston Villa	A	0–1	—	26,919
19 February 1994	Liverpool	H	2–0	Wetherall, McAllister	40,053
28 February 1994	Oldham Athletic	A	1–1	McAllister	11,136
5 March 1994	Southampton	H	0–0	—	30,890
13 March 1994	Sheffield United	A	2–2	Deane, Speed	19,250
16 March 1994	Aston Villa	H	2–0	Deane, Wallace	33,120
19 March 1994	Coventry City	H	1–0	Wallace	30,023
26 March 1994	Wimbledon	A	0–1	—	9,035
1 April 1994	Newcastle United	H	1–1	Fairclough	40,005
4 April 1994	Queens Park Rangers	A	4–0	Deane, White (2), Wallace	13,365
17 April 1994	Tottenham Hotspur	H	2–0	Wallace (2)	33,658
23 April 1994	Chelsea	A	1–1	Speed	18,544
27 April 1994	Manchester United	H	0–2	—	41,125
30 April 1994	Everton	H	3–0	White, Watson (o.g.), McAllister	35,487
3 May 1994	Sheffield Wednesday	H	2–2	White, Wallace	33,806
7 May 1994	Swindon Town	A	5–0	Deane (2), White, Fairclough, Wallace	17,228

=== FA Cup ===
Round	Date	Opponent	Venue	Result	Scorers	Attendance
Third Round	8 January 1994	Crewe Alexandra	H	3–1	Deane, Forrester (2)	23,475
Fourth Round	29 January 1994	Oxford United	A	2–2	Speed, Wetherall	11,029
Fourth Round Replay	9 February 1994	Oxford United	H	2–3	White, Strachan	22,167

=== League Cup ===
Round	Date	Opponent	Venue	Result	Scorers	Attendance
Second Round First-Leg	21 September 1993	Sunderland	A	1–2	Speed	17,101
Second Round Second-Leg	6 October 1993	Sunderland	H	1–2	Whelan	22,265

== Statistics ==
No.	Pos.	Name	League		FA Cup		League Cup		Total		Discipline	
No.	Pos.	Name	Apps	Goals	Apps	Goals	Apps	Goals	Apps	Goals	Yellow card	Red card
1	GK	(England) John Lukic	20	0	0	0	0	0	20	0	0	0
3	DF	(England) Tony Dorigo	37	0	3	0	2	0	42	0	2	0
4	MF	(England) David Batty	8+1	0	0	0	0	0	8+1	0	1	0
5	DF	(England) Chris Fairclough	40	4	3	0	2	0	45	4	4	0
6	DF	(Republic of Ireland) David O'Leary	10	0	0	0	0	0	10	0	1	0
7	MF	(Scotland) Gordon Strachan	32+1	3	3	1	2	0	37+1	4	0	0
8	FW	(England) Rod Wallace	34+3	17	1+1	0	1	0	36+4	17	3	0
9	FW	(England) Brian Deane	41	11	3	1	2	0	46	12	2	0
10	MF	(Scotland) Gary McAllister	42	8	3	0	2	0	47	8	3	0
11	MF	(Wales) Gary Speed	35+1	10	2	1	2	0	39+1	11	3	0
12	DF	(England) John Pemberton	6+3	0	0	0	0	0	6+3	0	3	0
13	GK	(England) Mark Beeney	22	0	3	0	2	0	27	0	0	0
14	MF	(England) Steve Hodge	7+1	1	1+2	0	1	0	9+3	1	1	0
14	FW	(England) David White	9+6	5	3	1	0	0	12+6	6	0	0
15	MF	(England) David Rocastle	6+1	1	0	0	0+1	0	6+2	1	0	0
16	DF	(England) Jon Newsome	25+4	1	3	0	1	0	29+4	1	6	0
17	FW	(Norway) Frank Strandli	0+4	0	1+2	0	0+1	0	1+7	0	0	0
18	DF	(England) David Wetherall	31+1	1	0+2	1	2	0	33+3	2	1	0
19	DF	(England) Ray Wallace	0+1	0	0	0	0	0	0+1	0	0	0
20	DF	(Canada) Kevin Sharp	7+3	0	0	0	0	0	7+3	0	1	0
22	DF	(Republic of Ireland) Gary Kelly	42	0	3	0	2	0	47	0	1	0
23	MF	(England) Mark Tinkler	0+3	0	0	0	0	0	0+3	0	0	0
25	FW	(England) Noel Whelan	6+10	0	0	0	1	1	7+10	1	1	0
26	FW	(England) Jamie Forrester	2+1	0	1+2	2	0	0	3+3	2	0	0
27	MF	(England) Mark Ford	0+1	0	0	0	0	0	0+1	0	0	0

== Transfers ==
=== In ===
Date	Pos.	Name	From	Fee
1 July 1993	DF	(Republic of Ireland) David O'Leary	(England) Arsenal	Free
14 July 1993	FW	(England) Brian Deane	(England) Sheffield United	£2,700,000
15 November 1993	DF	(England) John Pemberton	(England) Sheffield United	£250,000
27 December 1993	FW	(England) David White	(England) Manchester City	£2,000,000

=== Out ===
Date	Pos.	Name	From	Fee
1 July 1993	GK	(England) Mervyn Day	(England) Carlisle United	Free
1 July 1993	MF	(Malta) Dylan Kerr	(England) Reading	£75,000
1 August 1993	FW	(England) Carl Shutt	(England) Birmingham City	£50,000
1 August 1993	DF	(England) Chris Whyte	(England) Birmingham City	£250,000
7 August 1993	FW	(England) Lee Chapman	(England) Portsmouth	£250,000
1 September 1993	DF	(England) David Kerslake	(England) Tottenham Hotspur	£450,000
26 October 1993	MF	(England) David Batty	(England) Blackburn Rovers	£2,750,000
20 December 1993	MF	(England) David Rocastle	(England) Manchester City	£2,000,000
20 December 1993	DF	(England) Mel Sterland	Retired	

=== Loan out ===
Date from	Date to	Pos.	Name	To
1 March 1994	31 May 1994	DF	(England) Ray Wallace	(England) Reading
