= Football Live =

Football Live was the name given to the project and computer system created and utilised by PA Sport to collect Real Time Statistics from major English & Scottish Football Matches and distribute to most leading media organisations. At the time of its operation, more than 99% of all football statistics displayed across Print, Internet, Radio & TV Media outlets would have been collected via Football Live.

== Background ==
Prior to implementation of Football Live, the collection process consisted of a news reporter or press officer at each club telephoning the Press Association, relaying information on Teams, Goals and Half-Time & Full Time.

The basis for Football Live was to have a representative of the Press Association (FBA - Football Analyst) at every ground. Throughout the whole match they would stay on an open line on a mobile phone to a Sports Information Processor (SIP), constantly relaying in real time statistical information for every:

- Shot
- Foul
- Free Kick
- Goal
- Cross
- Goal Kick
- Offside

This information would be entered in real time and passed to its media customers.

The Football Live project was in use from Season 2001/02 until the service was taken over by Opta in 2013/14

== Commercial Customers ==
The most famous use for the Football Live data was for the Vidiprinter services on BBC & Sky Sports, allowing goals to be viewed on TV screens within 20 seconds of the event happening.

== League competitions ==
From its inception in 2001/02 season, the following leagues/competitions were fully covered by Football live

- English Premier League
- Championship
- League One
- League Two
- Conference
- Scottish Premier League
- English FA Cup
- English Football League Cup
- World Cup
- European Championships
- Champions League
- Europa League

== Football Analysts (FBA's) ==
During the early development stages, the initial idea was to employee ex-referees to act as Football Analysts, but this was soon dismissed in favour of ex-professional Footballers. The most famous of which were Brendon Ormsby, Mel Sterland, Jimmy Case, Neil Webb, John Sitton, Imre Varadi, Brian Kilcline, Gary Chivers, Micky Gynn . All the FBA's were supplied and managed by the Professional Football Association (PFA), with day-to-day responsibility lying with Paul Allen and Chris "Jozza" Joslin from the PFA.
