= Len Browning =

English footballer

Personal information
- Full name: Leonard James Browning
- Date of birth: 30 March 1928
- Place of birth: Doncaster, England
- Date of death: 27 September 2008 (aged 80)
- Place of death: Leeds, England
- Position: Striker

Senior career*
Years	Team	Apps	(Gls)
1946–1951	Leeds United	97	(43)
1951–1954	Sheffield United	65	(25)
- * Club domestic league appearances and goals

Leonard James Browning (30 March 1928 – 27 September 2008) was an English footballer. He played as a striker for Leeds United and Sheffield United. Browning joined Leeds as an 18-year-old in 1946, and moved to Sheffield United in 1951. He scored more than 70 goals in a career that lasted only eight years. Browning was forced to retire in 1954 after developing tuberculosis. He died on 27 September 2008 of prostate cancer.
