= Frank Strandli =

Norwegian footballer (born 1972)

Personal information
- Date of birth: 16 May 1972 (age 54)
- Place of birth: Kristiansand, Norway
- Height: 1.86 m (6 ft 1 in)
- Position: Forward

Senior career*
Years	Team	Apps	(Gls)
1989–1992	IK Start	81	(29)
1993–1994	Leeds United	16	(2)
1993	→ IK Start (loan)	8	(7)
1994	→ SK Brann (loan)	20	(7)
1995	SK Brann	23	(7)
1996–1997	Lillestrøm SK	38	(15)
1997–1999	Panathinaikos	39	(11)
1999–2001	Aalborg Boldspilklub	53	(24)
Total		278	(102)

International career
1989–1990	Norway u-18	6	(1)
1990–1993	Norway u-21	26	(12)
1992–1999	Norway	24	(3)
- * Club domestic league appearances and goals

Frank Strandli (born 16 May 1972) is a Norwegian former professional footballer who played as a forward.

== Club career ==
Strandli was recognised as a fast and physically strong striker. After success in IK Start, he signed for league champions Leeds United in early 1993 and scored on his debut, coming off the bench against Middlesbrough. However, he would score just one more goal and make just 15 further appearances for the Elland Road club.

Within months of arriving in England, he returned to his native Norway to play for IK Start on loan from May to July 1993, and in 1994 he was loaned to SK Brann, signing a permanent deal ahead of the 1995 season. After this earned success in Lillestrøm SK, scoring 15 times in 38 league games. This earned him a move to the Greek top club Panathinaikos.

His last professional club was AaB before he was forced to retire due to a groin injury. During his injury spell he received guidance from mental coach Christian M. Larsen. The coaching techniques Strandli learned at this stage of his career is believed to have helped him come back from injury. He made a return in 2009 with fellow footballer Andreas Lund when both joined FC Lund, a club in the Norwegian sixth tier as a central defender.

== International career ==
Strandli played 24 matches for the Norway national team, thus being one cap away from earning the Norwegian Football Association Gold Watch.

== Career statistics ==
Scores and results list Norway's goal tally first, score column indicates score after each Strandli goal.

List of international goals scored by Frank Strandli
No.	Date	Venue	Opponent	Score	Result	Competition
1	15 January 1994	Sun Devil Stadium, Tempe, United States	United States	1–0	1–2	Friendly
2	2 June 1996	Ullevaal Stadion, Oslo, Norway	Azerbaijan	4–0	5–0	1998 FIFA World Cup qualification
3	25 February 1998	Stade Vélodrome, Marseille, France	France	1–0	3–3	Friendly
