= 1992 FA Charity Shield =

- The match programme cover
Leeds United	Liverpool
4	3
- Date: 8 August 1992
- Venue: Wembley Stadium, London
- Man of the Match: Eric Cantona (Leeds United)
- Referee: David Elleray (Middlesex)
- Attendance: 61,291

The 1992 FA Charity Shield (also known as the Tennent's FA Charity Shield for sponsorship reasons) was the 70th Charity Shield, a football match contested by the winners of the previous season's Football League and FA Cup competitions. The match was played on 8 August 1992 between 1991–92 Football League champions Leeds United and 1991–92 FA Cup winners Liverpool.

Leeds won a dramatic match 4–3 with a hat-trick from Eric Cantona. As of 2025, this was Leeds' most recent Shield appearance.

The match saw Liverpool player Paul Stewart make his debut for the club. It was also the first competitive game that goalkeeper David James, an unused substitute, was involved in for Liverpool.

== Background ==
The FA Community Shield was founded in 1908 under its former name, the FA Charity Shield, and was initially contested between the top professional and amateur teams of each season. It was played between the Football League champions and FA Cup winners for the first time in 1921. Leeds United were appearing in the Charity Shield for the third time, having previously won one (1969) and lost one (1974), while Liverpool appeared in their eighteenth and had won thirteen, five of them shared, (1964, 1965, 1977, 1986, 1990) and lost four (1922, 1971, 1983, 1984).

The formation of a new top-tier division, the Premier League, in 1992 meant that Leeds were the last club to take part in the event as Football League champions. Wembley Stadium acted as the host of the Shield, but matches from 2001 were switched to the Millennium Stadium, while Wembley was being refurbished into a 90,000-capacity venue.

== Match details ==
8 August 1992
15:00

Leeds United	4–3	Liverpool
Cantona 26', 77', 87'; Dorigo 43'	Report	Rush 34'; Saunders 65'; Strachan 89' (o.g.)

Wembley Stadium, London
Attendance: 61,291
Referee: David Elleray (Middlesex)

Leeds United	Liverpool

GK	1	(England) John Lukic
LB	3	(England) Tony Dorigo
CB	5	(England) Chris Fairclough
CB	6	(England) Chris Whyte
RB	2	(England) Jon Newsome	(substituted off) 84'
LM	11	(Wales) Gary Speed
CM	4	(England) David Batty
CM	10	(Scotland) Gary McAllister (c)
RM	8	(England) Rod Wallace
CF	7	(France) Eric Cantona
CF	9	(England) Lee Chapman	(substituted off) 79'
Substitutes:
MF	12	(Scotland) Gordon Strachan	(substituted on) 84'
GK	13	(England) Mervyn Day
MF	14	(England) Steve Hodge	(substituted on) 79'
MF	15	(England) David Rocastle
DF	16	(England) David Wetherall
Manager:
(England) Howard Wilkinson

GK	1	(Zimbabwe) Bruce Grobbelaar
LB	3	(England) David Burrows
CB	2	(England) Nick Tanner
CB	6	(England) Mark Wright (c)
RB	4	(England) Mike Marsh	(substituted off) 72'
LM	10	(Israel) Ronny Rosenthal	(substituted off) 83'
CM	5	(Republic of Ireland) Ronnie Whelan
CM	8	(England) Paul Stewart
RM	11	(England) Mark Walters
CF	7	(Wales) Dean Saunders
CF	9	(Wales) Ian Rush
Substitutes:
DF	12	(England) Steve Harkness
GK	13	(England) David James
MF	14	(Hungary) István Kozma	(substituted on) 83'
MF	15	(Scotland) Don Hutchison	(substituted on) 72'
Manager:
(Scotland) Graeme Souness
