= Bobby Davison =

English footballer (born 1959)

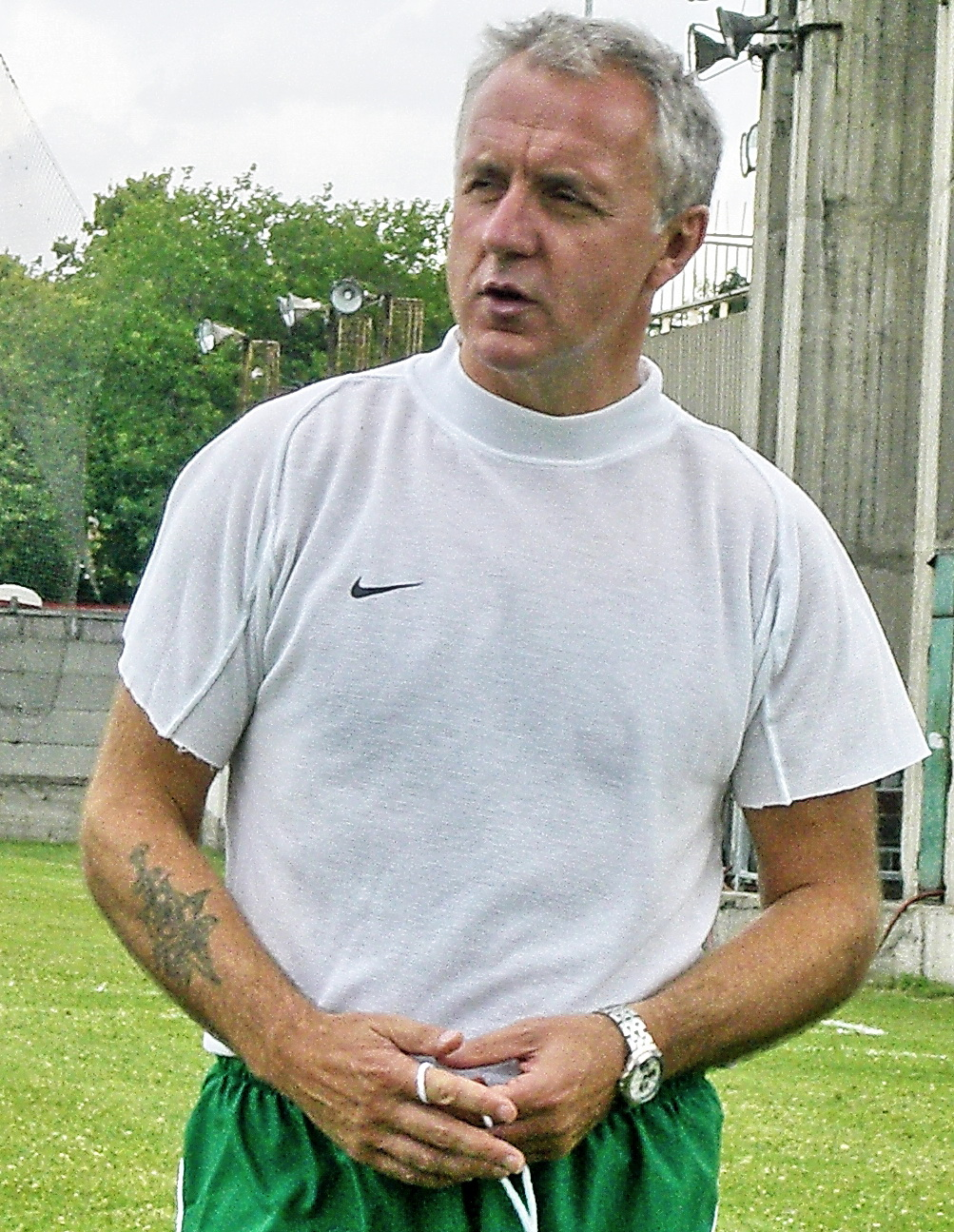

Personal information
- Full name: Robert Davison
- Date of birth: 17 July 1959 (age 67)
- Place of birth: South Shields, England
- Height: 5 ft 8 in (1.73 m)
- Position: Striker

Senior career*
Years	Team	Apps	(Gls)
1979–1980	Seaham Colliery Welfare Red Star		
1980–1981	Huddersfield Town	2	(0)
1981–1982	Halifax Town	63	(29)
1982–1987	Derby County	206	(83)
1987–1992	Leeds United	91	(30)
1991	→ Derby County (loan)	10	(8)
1992	→ Sheffield United (loan)	11	(4)
1992–1993	Leicester City	25	(6)
1993–1994	Sheffield United	12	(1)
1994–1996	Rotherham United	22	(4)
1995	→ Hull City (loan)	11	(4)
1996–1997	Halifax Town	25	(1)
1996	→ Guiseley (loan)	4	(7)
1997–2000	Guiseley	71	(22)
Total		553	(199)

Managerial career
- 1998–2000: Guiseley
- 2008–2009: Ferencváros
- 2012–2013: Eccleshill United
- * Club domestic league appearances and goals

Robert Davison (born 17 July 1959) is an English former professional footballer who played as a striker. He began his professional career with Huddersfield Town before spending time at Halifax Town, Derby County (twice), Leeds United, Sheffield United (twice), Leicester City, Rotherham United and Hull City. After he retired from playing he spent time on the coaching staff of a number of clubs, including brief spells as manager of Guiseley and Ferencváros, and is currently youth team coach at Crystal Palace and assistant manager to Noel Blake's England national under-19 football team.

== Playing career ==
Davison was born in South Shields. started his career at Seaham Colliery Welfare Red Star, before making two appearances for Huddersfield Town between 1980 and 1981. He moved on to Halifax Town on 1 August 1981 and holds a good record 29 goals in 63 appearances. This caught the eye of Derby County and between 1982 and 1987 he made 206 appearances scoring 83 goals, contributing towards their promotion to the Second Division in 1986 and the First Division a year later. He played a total of 206 league games for the Rams, scoring 83 goals and became a Derby legend.

Much to Derby fans' disappointment he was sold for £350,000 to a rebuilding Leeds United squad, managed by Billy Bremner, in November 1987.

Howard Wilkinson succeeded Bremner as Leeds managed in September 1988 and in the subsequent push for promotion Bobby became a cult hero for Leeds due to a high work rate and general rapport with the crowd. His scoring record of 35 times in 110 games is a good one for Leeds at that time. He helped them seal a return to the top flight as they sealed the Second Division title on the last day of the 1989–90 season by beating AFC Bournemouth 1–0 at Dean Court.

However, Davison lost his first team place for the 1990–91 season following the arrival of Lee Chapman, who was established as a top goalscorer. He played just five times in the 1990–91 First Division campaign and scored once as Leeds finished fourth. He managed just two league appearances in the 1991–92 campaign, which Leeds ended as champions. He was loaned back to Derby County (who suffered Second Division playoff disappointment in 1991–92) that season, scoring an impressive eight goals in just 10 league games, but the permanent return to the Baseball Ground never happened.

In 1992, he was released to Leicester City. After helping Leicester come close to achieving promotion to the Premier League, he found himself out of favour with the club, so joined Sheffield United in 1993. Again, after coming close to achieving promotion, he found himself out of favour before joining Rotherham United. After a loan spell at Hull City, Davison returned to Halifax Town, where he made 30 appearances in all competitions, scoring once.

== Coaching career ==
In February 1998, Davison was appointed player-manager at Guiseley. He offered his resignation in October 2000 after a string of poor results left them dicing with relegation. Davison was Assistant Manager to Colin Todd at Bradford City for three years, he left the club in June 2007 when Stuart McCall brought in Wayne Jacobs. He also had short a short spell coaching Sheffield United.

On 20 February 2008, when Sheffield United announced their takeover of Ferencváros, they also announced the appointment of Davison as an advisory coach to the Hungarian side. On 16 April 2008, after the removal of János Csank, Davison became Ferencváros's new head coach. His first game in charge was a 1–0 victory against Bõcs KSC, and the team went on to win promotion the next season by 17 points. On 30 October 2009, Ferencváros replaced the dismissed Davison with Craig Short.

In November 2010, Davison joined his former club Leeds United as youth team coach.

In December 2012, Davison was appointed head coach at Eccleshill United.

== Career statistics ==
Appearances and goals by club, season and competition
Club	Season	League			FA Cup		League Cup		Other		Total	
Club	Season	Division	Apps	Goals	Apps	Goals	Apps	Goals	Apps	Goals	Apps	Goals
Huddersfield Town	1980–81	Third Division	2	0	0	0	0	0	—		2	0
Halifax Town	1981–82	Fourth Division	46	20	1	0	2	1	—		49	21
Halifax Town	1982–83	Fourth Division	17	9	1	0	2	3	3 (Note: Appearances in Football League Group Cup)	4	23	16
Halifax Town	Total		63	29	2	0	4	4	3	4	72	37
Derby County	1982–83	Second Division	26	8	—		—		—		26	8
Derby County	1983–84	Second Division	40	14	5	4	2	0	—		47	18
Derby County	1984–85	Third Division	46	24	1	0	4	0	2 (Note: Appearances in Football League Trophy)	2	53	26
Derby County	1985–86	Third Division	41	17	4	3	5	3	0	0	50	23
Derby County	1986–87	Second Division	40	19	1	0	6	3	2 (Note: Appearances in Full Members' Cup)	0	49	22
Derby County	1987–88	First Division	13	1	—		1	0	—		14	1
Derby County	Total		206	83	11	7	18	6	4	2	239	98
Leeds United	1987–88	Second Division	16	5	1	1	—		2	0	19	6
Leeds United	1988–89	Second Division	39	14	2	0	2	1	2	2	45	17
Leeds United	1989–90	Second Division	29	10	0	0	2	0	2	1	33	11
Leeds United	1990–91	First Division	5	1	2	0	—		3	0	10	1
Leeds United	1991–92	First Division	2	0	1	0	0	0	—		3	0
Leeds United	Total		91	30	6	1	4	1	9	3	110	35
Derby County (loan)	1991–92	Second Division	10	8	—		0	0	0	0	10	8
Sheffield United (loan)	1991–92	First Division	11	4	—		—		—		11	4
Leicester City	1992–93	Division One	25	6	0	0	3	1	2 (Note: Appearances in Anglo-Italian Cup)	2	30	9
Leicester City	1993–94	Division One	0	0	—		0	0	1	0	1	0
Leicester City	Total		25	6	0	0	3	1	3	2	31	9
Sheffield United	1993–94	Premier League	9	0	0	0	1	1	—		10	1
Sheffield United	1994–95	Division One	3	1	—		1	0	2	0	6	1
Sheffield United	Total		12	1	0	0	2	1	2	0	16	2
Rotherham United	1994–95	Division Two	21	4	2	3	—		2	0	25	7
Rotherham United	1995–96	Division Two	1	0	0	0	1	0	0	0	2	0
Rotherham United	Total		22	4	2	3	1	0	2	0	27	7
Hull City (loan)	1995–96	Division Two	11	4	—		—		1	0	12	4
Halifax Town	1996–97	Football Conference	25	1	2	0	—		3 (Note: Two appearances in FA Trophy, one appearance in West Riding Senior Cup)	0	30	1
Guiseley (loan)	1996–97	Northern Premier League Premier Division	4	7	—		—		2 (Note: One appearance in Northern Premier League Challenge Cup, one appearance in Northern Premier League President's Cup)	0	6	7
Guiseley	1997–98	Northern Premier League Premier Division	33	15	2	3	—		14 (Note: Seven appearances two goals in Northern Premier League President's Cup, four appearances one goal in West Riding County Cup, two appearances in FA Trophy, one appearance in Northern Premier League Challenge Cup)	3	49	21
Guiseley	1998–99	Northern Premier League Premier Division	21	6	2	0	—		7 (Note: Three appearances one goal in FA Trophy, two appearances two goals in Northern Premier League Challenge Cup, one appearance in Northern Premier League President's Cup, one appearance in West Riding County Cup)	3	30	9
Guiseley	1999–00	Northern Premier League Premier Division	16	1	0	0	—		2 (Note: Appearances in Northern Premier League Challenge Cup)	1	18	2
Guiseley	2000–01	Northern Premier League Division One	1	0	0	0	—		—		1	0
Guiseley	Total		75	29	4	3	—		25	7	104	39
Career total			553	199	27	14	32	13	52	18	664	244

== Honours ==
Leeds United

- Football League Second Division: 1989–90

Individual

- PFA Team of the Year: 1986–87 Second Division

Awards and achievements
Preceded by Archie Gemmill	Derby County Player of the Year; 1984–85	Succeeded by Ross MacLaren
