= Imre Varadi =

English footballer and manager

Personal information
- Full name: Imre Varadi
- Date of birth: 8 July 1959 (age 67)
- Place of birth: Paddington, London, England
- Height: 5 ft 8 in (1.73 m)
- Position: Forward

Senior career*
Years	Team	Apps	(Gls)
1977–1978	Letchworth		
1978–1979	Sheffield United	10	(4)
1979–1981	Everton	26	(6)
1981–1983	Newcastle United	81	(39)
1983–1985	Sheffield Wednesday	76	(33)
1985–1986	West Bromwich Albion	32	(9)
1986–1988	Manchester City	65	(26)
1988–1990	Sheffield Wednesday	22	(3)
1990–1993	Leeds United	26	(5)
1992	→ Luton Town (loan)	6	(1)
1993	→ Oxford United (loan)	5	(0)
1993–1995	Rotherham United	67	(25)
1995	Mansfield Town	1	(0)
1995	Boston United		
1995	Scunthorpe United	2	(0)
1995–1996	Matlock Town		(0)
1996–1997	Guiseley	3	(3)
1997	South Jersey Barons	2	(1)
1998	Stalybridge Celtic	1	(0)

Managerial career
- 1995–1996: Matlock Town
- * Club domestic league appearances and goals

Imre Varadi (born 8 July 1959) is an English former professional football player and manager who played as a forward. Known as a journeyman, he appeared for 16 clubs at all levels of professional football in England.

== Early life ==
Varadi was born in Paddington, London, to a Hungarian father and Italian mother.

== Club career ==
Varadi started out in non-League football with Letchworth before joining Sheffield United in 1978, shortly before his nineteenth birthday.

Varadi went on to become a nomadic journeyman, who rarely spent more than two years with any club and never made 100 league appearances in the colours of any team he played for.

From Sheffield United, he moved on to Everton in the First Division, before dropping into the Second Division to join Newcastle United, later joining Sheffield Wednesday, West Bromwich Albion, Manchester City, Swansea Town, Sheffield Wednesday again, Leeds United, Luton Town, Oxford United, Rotherham United, Mansfield Town, Boston United, Scunthorpe United and finally had a spell as player-manager at Matlock Town.

He was part of the Leeds United side that won the old First Division in 1992 but only played in three matches which was not enough games to earn a winner's medal. He was also part of the Sheffield Wednesday side that won promotion to the First Division in 1984, after 14 years away. He was sold to West Bromwich Albion a year later and was their top scorer with nine league goals in 1985–86, but was unable to prevent them from being relegated in bottom place with just four wins in the league. He was then sold to Manchester City, and was unable to prevent their relegation the following season, although he did help them reach the quarter-finals of the FA Cup in his second campaign there. He was nicknamed "Imre Banana" by the City fans, following the inflatable banana craze which the club's fans helped start that season. He scored 26 league goals in two seasons at Maine Road.

After City failed to win an immediate return to the First Division, he left Maine Road to sign for Sheffield Wednesday for a second time in the summer of 1988, and spent two seasons there, but after 18 months he was sold to their Yorkshire rivals Leeds United in February 1990. He spent three years at Elland Road, helping them win promotion to the First Division on his arrival, but rarely played for Leeds in the First Division due to the gradual arrival and breakthrough of a host of new players in the midfield and forward positions. He did not make enough appearances in 1991–92 to earn a league title medal. He had loan spells at Luton Town and Oxford United before finally exiting Elland Road and dropping down two divisions to sign for Rotherham United in the summer of 1993.

He spent two seasons at Millmoor, scoring 25 Division Two goals, before brief spells at Mansfield Town and Scunthorpe United. He called time on his professional career in 1995 when he became player-manager of non-league Matlock Town, before joining Guiseley.

In the spring of 1997, Varadi signed with the South Jersey Barons of the USISL D-3 Pro League in the United States. He only played in two league games before returning home to England with his manager Matt Driver citing "personal reasons." He scored his lone goal of his brief stint with the Barons against the New Hampshire Phantoms on 3 May 1997 in the club's first-ever home game at Carey Stadium in Ocean City, New Jersey.

He broke his retirement for one game for Stalybridge Celtic in 1998.

== Post-retirement ==
Varadi became a fully licensed FIFA Agent in March 2004 and provides commentary on games for both PA Sport (for the Football Live project) and BBC Radio Sheffield.

== Honours ==
Leeds United

- Football League Second Division: 1989–90
