= Peter Haddock =

English footballer

Personal information
- Full name: Peter Murray Haddock
- Date of birth: 9 December 1961 (age 64)
- Place of birth: Newcastle upon Tyne, England
- Height: 5 ft 11 in (1.80 m)
- Position: Defender

Youth career
- 1978–1979: Newcastle United

Senior career*
Years	Team	Apps	(Gls)
1979–1986	Newcastle United	57	(0)
1986	→ Burnley (loan)	7	(0)
1986–1991	Leeds United	118	(1)
Total		183	(1)
- * Club domestic league appearances and goals

Peter Murray Haddock (born 9 December 1961) is an English former footballer who played in the Football League as a centre back or right back for Newcastle United, Burnley and Leeds United.

Haddock was born in Newcastle upon Tyne, and joined his home-town club as an apprentice in 1978, turning professional the following year. He made his debut in the Football League on 5 September 1981 in a 3–0 defeat at Queens Park Rangers in the Second Division. He played in a calm and collected manner and got a good run in the side during 1981–82 but lost his place halfway through the following season following the arrival of Glenn Roeder and Jeff Clarke. He remained at the club, playing only infrequently, and had a spell on loan at Burnley, before leaving for Leeds United in July 1986 for a fee of £45,000.

During the early part of his career at Leeds he suffered a series of injuries, limiting his first-team appearances. However once he had returned he won player of the year in 1988. Under the stewardship of Howard Wilkinson "Fish", as he was known, became a crucial part of the defensive unit alongside Chris Fairclough that won promotion as Second Division champions in 1989–90. His career was cut short however when he suffered a freak injury in the second leg of the League Cup semi-final against Manchester United in 1991, as Leeds went out 3–1 on aggregate.

== Honours ==
Leeds United

- Football League Second Division: 1989–90
