= Ian Baird =

English footballer (born 1964)

Personal information
- Full name: Ian James Baird
- Date of birth: 1 April 1964 (age 62)
- Place of birth: Rotherham, England
- Height: 6 ft 0 in (1.83 m)
- Position: Striker

Youth career
- 1978–1982: Southampton

Senior career*
Years	Team	Apps	(Gls)
1982–1985	Southampton	22	(5)
1983–1984	→ Cardiff City (loan)	12	(6)
1984	→ Newcastle United (loan)	5	(1)
1985–1987	Leeds United	85	(33)
1987–1988	Portsmouth	20	(1)
1988–1990	Leeds United	77	(17)
1990–1991	Middlesbrough	63	(19)
1991–1993	Hearts	64	(15)
1993–1995	Bristol City	57	(11)
1995–1996	Plymouth Argyle^{[a]}	27	(5)
1996–1997	Brighton & Hove Albion	44	(14)
1997–1998	Instant-Dict FC	22	(18)
Total		498	(145)

Managerial career
- 1998: Instant-Dict
- 1999: Hong Kong
- 2004–2007: Havant & Waterlooville
- 2007–2012: Eastleigh
- 2014–2019: Sutton United (assistant)
- 2019: Sutton United (caretaker)
- 2019–2023: Havant & Waterlooville (assistant)
- * Club domestic league appearances and goals

Ian James Baird (born 1 April 1964) is an English former professional footballer whose most notable spells were as a Leeds United player. During his first period at the club he spent a season as captain. He won a player of the year award in his second stint in West Yorkshire, as well as a Second Division Championship medal (following his departure). He played as a striker.

== Early life ==
Baird was born in Rotherham, West Riding of Yorkshire, England but grew up in Hampshire.

== Playing career ==
=== Southampton ===
Baird started his career playing for local sides Bitterne Saints and St. Mary's College before signing with Southampton in 1982–83. He was also chosen to represent Hampshire at county level and was capped for England at schoolboy level. He turned professional in April 1982 and played a handful of matches for the first team. He spent part of the 1983–84 season on loan at Cardiff City scoring six goals in 12 appearances. Discussions were held over making the transfer permanent but Cardiff eventually pulled out of the deal over the proposed fee. At the start of the 1984–85 season, he moved on loan to Newcastle United, making five appearances, scoring one goal, and was booked in all of his appearances.

=== Leeds United ===
In March 1985 after only 22 appearances and five goals for Southampton he moved to Leeds United for £75,000, having turned down transfers to Manchester City and Middlesbrough earlier in the season. He made his debut for the club in a 3–1 defeat to Portsmouth on 12 March 1985, scoring his first goal in his fourth appearance, a 2–1 victory over Manchester City one month later.

Despite not scoring many goals, Baird's first spell at Leeds was a success. His aggression, whole-hearted attitude, skill and goals made him immensely popular amongst the Leeds fans. Baird was made Leeds captain by manager Billy Bremner at the start of the 1986–87 season and his performances alerted Portsmouth to his abilities, as he helped lead Leeds to both the FA Cup semi-final (lost 2–3 (aet) to Coventry City and the final of the inaugural Second Division promotion/First Division relegation play-offs. Leeds drew the two-legged play-offs final with Charlton Athletic (1–0, 0–1) but lost a one-off deciding rubber (1–2 aet) at St Andrews and remained in the Second Division.

=== Portsmouth ===
At the end of the 1986–87 season, Baird's contract with Leeds had expired leaving him free to move elsewhere. After rejecting Bremner's contract offer to remain with Leeds, he received offers from Celtic, Aberdeen, Queens Park Rangers and West Ham United, he eventually signed with Portsmouth, newly promoted to the First Division. He was sold for £285,000, a record fee for Portsmouth that had been decided by tribunal. Keen to move back to the South of England, he was signed as a replacement for Micky Quinn, who was expected to leave the club soon after and his sale used to fund Baird's arrival. However, Quinn refused to move to either of the two clubs interested, Millwall and Watford, leaving the club short of funds and resulting in Portsmouth chairman John Deacon looking to sell Baird days after his arrival.

Baird remained with the club but struggled for form, clashing with manager Alan Ball Jr. He was dropped from the first team over the Christmas period and was made to train away from the rest of the squad, along with Kenny Swain, after criticising Ball in a newspaper interview. Scoring only one goal in his 20 appearances for the club, during a 2–1 defeat to Queens Park Rangers, in the 1987–88 season. Baird later described his move to Portsmouth as "100-per-cent the worst decision I made in my career."

=== Leeds United (second spell) ===
Portsmouth were struggling financially and in March 1988, Baird was sold back to Leeds for less than half the price they bought him for (£120,000). Baird was once again successful at Leeds picking up player of the year in 1989 but the arrival of Lee Chapman, to help with the promotion push in 1989–90, led to a fallout between Baird and manager Howard Wilkinson. Baird took Chapman's arrival as an attempt to replace him leading to a confrontation with Wilkinson which resulted in Baird demanding a transfer away from Leeds. Despite Wilkinson's attempts to dissuade him, including an offer of an improved contract, he decided to leave the club having played 77 league games and scored 17 goals.

=== Middlesbrough ===
In January 1990 he was sold to Middlesbrough for £500,000. Baird's involvement in the championship didn't stop there. On the last day of the season Baird scored two goals against Newcastle United, and this along with Leeds' victory over AFC Bournemouth clinched promotion for Leeds over Newcastle in third place (Leeds winning the title on goal difference over Sheffield United). With Leeds winning the title Baird picked up a winners medal, even though he was not at Leeds any more due to him having played enough games for the club in the season.

=== Hearts ===
Baird stayed at Boro until the end of 1990–91 when he moved to Hearts on a two-year contract, being persuaded to join by his former Southampton teammate Joe Jordan who was managing the club. He scored on his debut for the club in August 1991 during a victory over Airdrieonians F.C. In his first season, Baird enjoyed a strong start to the season, scoring eight times. However, he suffered a torn thigh muscle that restricted his appearances and later claimed that returning early from the injury severely affected his form as he failed to score during the second half of the season.

During a match against Aberdeen in April 1993, Baird played as a goalkeeper after Nicky Walker suffered an injury in the prematch warm-up. With no reserve goalkeeper, Baird was chosen to take his place as Hearts went on to lose 3–2. He was offered a new contract at the end of the season but rejected the offer.

=== Later career ===
He later returned to England, playing for Bristol City and Plymouth Argyle before joining Brighton & Hove Albion. At Brighton, he was involved in the club's relegation battle during the 1996–97 season when they avoided dropping out of the Football League on the last day of the season after drawing 1–1 with Hereford United, who were relegated instead. Mounting injury problems eventually forced Baird to retire in 1997 after being advised by a surgeon that continuing would damage his knee.

He was later invited to play in Hong Kong by Mike Leonard and signed an 18-month contract with Instant-Dict after an initial trial period. However, further knee problems eventually led to him retiring again.

== Coaching and managerial career ==
After retiring from his playing career Ian went to Hong Kong taking charge of Instant-Dict, a team in their top division, and also the national side in 1999 for the 2000 Asian Cup qualifiers. He also played non-league football for Salisbury City (1997–2000) and Farnborough Town (2000–2001).

After returning from Hong Kong he worked for a Leeds-based football agent but resigned after 3 years as he didn't enjoy the job. Ian set up his own contract hire and vehicle leasing company in 2003.

He took over the part-time managerial post at Havant & Waterlooville in November 2004. He currently lives in Southampton with his second wife and two teenage children.

On 3 October 2007, he was appointed manager at Conference South rivals Eastleigh, taking over from David Hughes. After five years in charge, he was dismissed on 11 September 2012.

Baird was appointed assistant manager at Sutton United in October 2014 under manager Paul Doswell. At the end of March 2019, Doswell was fired and Baird took over as caretaker manager. Baird left the club on 29 April 2019.

In May 2019, Paul Doswell was appointed manager of Havant & Waterlooville and Baird followed him as his assistant. Baird resigned in August 2023.

== Life outside football ==
Baird's authorised biography, Bairdy's Gonna Get Ya!: The Ian Baird Story, written by Marc Bracha, was published in September 2013.

== Honours ==
Plymouth Argyle

- Football League Third Division play-offs: 1996

== Notes ==
a. The first goal in the 3–0 win for Plymouth Argyle at Lincoln City on 30 September 1995 that was originally given to Baird was later credited as an own-goal.

== Bibliography ==
- Mourant, Andrew (1992). Leeds United Player By Player. Guinness Publishing Limited. ISBN 0-85112-568-9.
- Rowley, Les; Ray, John (2005). Where are They Now?. YFP Publishing. ISBN 0-9545333-3-X.
