= John Pearson (footballer, born 1963) =

British association football player (born 1963)

Personal information
- Full name: John Stuart Pearson
- Date of birth: 1 September 1963 (age 63)
- Place of birth: Sheffield, England
- Height: 6 ft 2 in (1.88 m)
- Position: Forward

Senior career*
Years	Team	Apps	(Gls)
1980–1985	Sheffield Wednesday	105	(24)
1985–1987	Charlton Athletic	61	(15)
1987–1991	Leeds United	99	(12)
1990–1991	→ Rotherham United (loan)	11	(5)
1991–1993	Barnsley	32	(4)
1991–1992	→ Hull City (loan)	15	(0)
1993–1994	Carlisle United	8	(0)
1994	Mansfield Town	2	(0)
1995	Cardiff City	12	(0)
–	Merthyr Tydfil		
Total		345	(60)

International career
1981–1982	England Youth	3	(1)
- * Club domestic league appearances and goals

John Stuart Pearson (born 1 September 1963) is an English former professional footballer who played in the Football League for Sheffield Wednesday, Charlton Athletic, Leeds United, Rotherham United, Barnsley, Hull City, Carlisle United, Mansfield Town and Cardiff City. Pearson is now part of the commentary team for Sheffield Wednesday's matches on Wednesday Player along with Rob O'Neill.

As a player, he was part of the Leeds United team that won promotion to the First Division in 1990 as Second Division champions. He played for Leeds from 1986 to 1991, and although he only found the net 12 times in 99 league appearances during that time, this included a hat-trick against Sheffield United in the Second Division on 19 March 1988 in a 5–0 win at Elland Road.
