= Chris Whyte =

English footballer

Personal information
- Full name: Christopher Anderson Whyte
- Date of birth: 2 September 1961 (age 65)
- Place of birth: London, England
- Height: 6 ft 1 in (1.85 m)
- Position: Defender

Youth career
- Arsenal

Senior career*
Years	Team	Apps	(Gls)
1980–1986	Arsenal	90	(8)
1984–1985	→ Crystal Palace (loan)	13	(0)
1986–1987	New York Express (indoor)	26	(11)
1987–1988	Los Angeles Lazers (indoor)	77	(27)
1988–1990	West Bromwich Albion	84	(7)
1990–1993	Leeds United	113	(5)
1993–1996	Birmingham City	68	(1)
1995	→ Coventry City (loan)	1	(0)
1996	→ West Ham United (loan)	0	(0)
1996	Charlton Athletic	11	(1)
1996	Detroit Neon (indoor)	4	(0)
1997	Detroit Safari (indoor)	12	(1)
1997	Leyton Orient	1	(0)
1997	Oxford United	10	(0)
1997–1999	Rushden & Diamonds	53	(1)
1999	Raleigh Express	7	(0)
1999–2000	Harlow Town	34	(0)
2000	HyPS	10	(0)
Total		495 (Note: Excluding indoor stats (119 matches).)	(23 (Note: Excluding indoor stats (39 goals).))

International career
1982	England U21	4	(0)
- * Club domestic league appearances and goals

Christopher Anderson Whyte (born 2 September 1961) is an English former footballer who played as a central defender and made nearly 400 appearances in the Football League and Premier League. He had lengthy spells with Arsenal, West Bromwich Albion, Leeds United – where he was a pivotal part of their 1991–92 title-winning team – and Birmingham City, and also played for numerous other clubs in England and abroad. Whyte was capped by England at under-21 level.

== Club career ==
Whyte was born in Islington, London, and started his career as a youth player at Arsenal, turning professional in September 1978. A defender who played at centre half (but also less often at full back), he made his first team debut as a substitute against Panathinaikos in the UEFA Cup on 30 September 1981. He made his first appearance in the Football League against Manchester City on 17 October, and went on to start all but one of Arsenal's remaining league matches that season, partnering David O'Leary in central defence. Whyte stood out with his coolness and confidence, as well as his timing and good judgement of the game. The following season, Whyte continued as a regular for Arsenal as the team reached the semi-finals of both domestic cup competitions, and took his tally of England under-21 caps to four.

However, after Arsenal's shock League Cup loss to Walsall in November 1983 and the subsequent dismissal of Terry Neill, Whyte was dropped from the side in favour of new signing Tommy Caton. The emergence of Tony Adams forced Whyte further down the pecking order at Highbury. He made no appearances for Arsenal during 1984–85, instead being loaned out to Crystal Palace, and although he had a brief run as an emergency striker in 1985–86, he was given a free transfer at the end of that season. In all he played 113 matches for Arsenal, scoring eight goals.

No domestic club offered Whyte a contract, and he left for the United States and played for two years in the Major Indoor Soccer League for New York Express and Los Angeles Lazers. In the summer of 1988, he was offered a return to England by Second Division West Bromwich Albion; He made his Albion debut in a League Cup tie against Peterborough United in September 1988, and ended the 1988–89 season as the club's Player of the Year.

Whyte returned to the top flight in 1990, when he was signed for £450,000 by Howard Wilkinson's Leeds United. He was nearly ever-present for the next three seasons, putting in 146 appearances as Leeds won the 1991–92 First Division title. In 1993, he moved to Birmingham City, winning the 1994–95 Second Division title with the Blues. After a brief spell at Coventry City on loan, Whyte left Birmingham in 1996, and subsequently played for Charlton Athletic, Leyton Orient, Oxford United and Rushden & Diamonds.

He then returned to the United States for a spell with the Raleigh Express in the A-League before returning to England to play under former Arsenal teammate Ian Allinson, manager of Harlow Town of Rymans League Division One. In 2000, he played for Finnish third-tier club HyPS.

== International career ==
Whyte was capped four times for the England under-21 team. His first two appearances were in the semi-finals of the 1982 UEFA European Under-21 Championship in April 1982, but he did not play in the final. His third and fourth appearances were later that year, in qualifiers for the next edition of the championships.

== Honours ==
Leeds United

- Football League First Division: 1991–92
- FA Charity Shield: 1992

Birmingham City

- Football League Second Division: 1994–95

England Under-21

- UEFA Under-21 European Championship: 1982

Individual

- West Bromwich Albion Player of the Year: 1989
