= Glynn Snodin =

English football coach and former professional player

Personal information
- Full name: Glynn Snodin
- Date of birth: 14 February 1960 (age 66)
- Place of birth: Thrybergh, Rotherham, England
- Height: 5 ft 6 in (1.68 m)
- Position: Full-back

Youth career
- Doncaster Rovers

Senior career*
Years	Team	Apps	(Gls)
1977–1985	Doncaster Rovers	309	(59)
1985–1987	Sheffield Wednesday	59	(1)
1987–1992	Leeds United	94	(10)
1991	→ Oldham Athletic (loan)	8	(1)
1992	→ Rotherham United (loan)	3	(0)
1992–1993	Hearts	42	(2)
1993–1995	Barnsley	25	(0)
1995–1998	Gainsborough Trinity	128	(67)
2010–2013	Yorkshire Main		
Total		660	(138)

Managerial career
- 2000–2006: Charlton Athletic Reserves
- * Club domestic league appearances and goals

Glynn Snodin (born 14 February 1960) is an English football coach, and former professional player.

As a player, he was a midfielder from 1977 to 1998. He played for Doncaster Rovers and later made just under 100 appearances for Leeds United and spent two years with Sheffield Wednesday. Whilst with Leeds, Snodin was loaned out to Oldham Athletic and Rotherham United before having spell with Scottish Premier Division side Hearts. In 1993, he spent two years with Barnsley before finishing his playing career in the Northern Premier League with Gainsborough Trinity. He later came out of retirement 14 years later joining non-league outfit Yorkshire Main on a sporadic basis where he played a handful of games over a three year period.

Since retiring Snodin has held various scouting and coaching roles firstly with Carlisle United and then returning to former club Doncaster. He later became manager of Charlton Athletic's reserve team before joining the coaching staff at Southampton and Northern Ireland. He has since been on the coaching staff at West Ham United, Leeds United, Huddersfield Town, Preston North End, Sunderland, Bradford City and Chesterfield.

== Playing career ==
Snodin started his professional career at Doncaster Rovers as a 16-year-old in 1977, making his debut in a 3–1 defeat to Bradford City on 2 April 1977. He initially played as a winger or striker before being used as a left-back under manager Billy Bremner where he excelled. He remained with the club until June 1985 as they moved up and down between Division's 4 and 3. At Doncaster he made over 300 appearances, many of them alongside his younger brother Ian.

In June 1985 he was sold for £135,000 to First Division Sheffield Wednesday, where he stayed for two seasons, playing 59 league games, and also reaching the FA Cup semi-final in 1986, before taking a move down a division to Leeds United (for a fee of £150,000) from a desire to rejoin former boss Billy Bremner from his Doncaster days. A whole-hearted and dependable player, he scored 13 goals in 116 appearances for Leeds, but found his chances limited by the arrival of Tony Dorigo. By the 1989–90 season he was a fringe player as Leeds gained promotion to Division 1.

He then had periods on loan to Oldham Athletic and Rotherham United, before to Scotland to join Joe Jordan's Hearts in March 1992. During his time at Tynecastle he scored once in the UEFA Cup against Slavia Prague, to give Hearts a 4–2 victory which saw them progress 4–3 on aggregate. When Jordan left Tynecastle, Snodin returned South to join Barnsley in July 1993, spending two seasons in the First Division, before a move to Gainsborough Trinity, where he saw out his final playing years with the club, retiring in the summer of 1997.

== Coaching career ==
Snodin initially began coaching youngsters whilst playing at Gainsborough Trinity as he ran the "Glynn Snodin Soccer Academy" at Gainsborough Leisure Centre on Saturday mornings between 1995 and 1997. He then became chief scout at Carlisle United under Mick Wadsworth while he took his coaching badges. He followed Wadsworth to Scarborough as youth team coach, before returning to his first club, Doncaster Rovers as assistant manager to his brother Ian.

In 2000, he joined the coaching staff at Charlton Athletic as reserve team manager, leading them to the Reserve League title in 2004 and 2005. He completed his UEFA Pro Licence alongside George Burley and in March 2006, Burley brought Snodin to Southampton as first team coach.

In a press conference on 1 June 2007, to reveal Nigel Worthington as the new manager of Northern Ireland, Snodin was made assistant manager and Fred Barber was announced as coach. On 26 June 2007, he joined his former Charlton Athletic colleague Alan Curbishley at West Ham United. When Curbishley left in September 2008 and Gianfranco Zola was appointed in his place, Snodin was not retained on the coaching staff.

On 2 February 2009, Snodin was appointed the new assistant manager of Leeds United. Snodin was part of the Leeds management team who earned a 1–0 win away to Manchester United in the FA Cup third round. Glynn had some great times at Leeds, including some famous results in the FA Cup and promotion from League One back to the Championship in the 09/10 season. With Leeds in tenth position in the Championship, three points below the play-off places, Snodin was sacked as assistant manager along with manager Simon Grayson and coach Ian Miller on Wednesday 1 February 2012.

Less than three weeks after leaving Leeds United, the management trio was back in work at neighbouring League One club Huddersfield Town, when on 21 February 2012 Simon Grayson was appointed manager, saying "Glynn Snodin and Ian Miller are the perfect pair to help me achieve success." They won promotion at the end of that season. Grayson, Snodin and Miller were dismissed from Huddersfield on 24 January 2013.

In May 2013 Grayson was announced as the new manager at Preston North End replacing Graham Westley, with Snodin joining him again.

He worked with Grayson at Sunderland, as assistant manager.

He worked with Grayson at Bradford City, as assistant manager.

In January 2019, Snodin was appointed assistant manager to John Sheridan at National League club Chesterfield. Having missed much of the first half of the 2019–20 season due to health problems, he left the club alongside Sheridan on 2 January 2020 following a poor run of form.

== Personal life ==
He is the elder brother of fellow professional footballer Ian Snodin
