= Mel Sterland =

English footballer and manager (born 1961)

Personal information
- Full name: Melvyn Sterland
- Date of birth: 1 October 1961 (age 65)
- Place of birth: Sheffield, England
- Height: 5 ft 10 in (1.78 m)
- Position: Right back

Senior career*
Years	Team	Apps	(Gls)
1978–1989	Sheffield Wednesday	279	(37)
1989	Rangers	9	(3)
1989–1994	Leeds United	114	(16)
1994–1996	Boston United	32	(5)
- Denaby United
Total		434	(73)

International career
1983–1984	England U21	7	(3)
1988	England	1	(0)

Managerial career
- 1994–1996: Boston United
- 1997–?: Stalybridge Celtic
- * Club domestic league appearances and goals

Melvyn Sterland (born 1 October 1961) is an English former professional footballer who played in the Football League for Sheffield Wednesday and Leeds United and in the Scottish Football League Premier Division for Rangers, and was capped once for England.

== Club career ==
Sterland's career is distinctly in two parts: 10 successful years with Sheffield Wednesday and 4 equally successful years with Leeds United split by four months at Rangers.

An energetic, dynamic right back, Mel's powerful shooting earned him the nickname 'Zico' – after the Brazilian star – and his attacking prowess saw him strike 49 goals for Sheffield Wednesday, many from set-pieces. His surges down the right flank and deliveries into the box often created goals for his teammates and he was also known for his lengthy throw-ins. He signed for Sheffield Wednesday on leaving school in the summer of 1978 and played in the final two games of their 1978–79 Third Division campaign, scoring on his second appearance.

The Owls were promoted to the Second Division a year later, but Sterland was still very much a fringe player, making just two league appearances. However, he emerged as a regular player in 1980–81, when still only 19 years old, playing 22 league games and scoring once in the Second Division.

In 1981–82, when the Owls emerged as promotion challengers but were eventually beaten out of the top three, Sterland was selected in the league on 27 occasions. He remained a regular player as the Owls continued to progress, reaching the FA Cup semi-finals in 1983 and winning promotion to the First Division a year later after a 14-year exile. In 1985–86 he enjoyed arguably the finest season of his time at Sheffield Wednesday, if not his whole career, when he played 38 league games and scored eight goals for a side who finished fifth in the First Division but were denied UEFA Cup action due to the ban on English clubs in European competitions following the Heysel disaster of May 1985.

By the time he was sold to Rangers for £800,000 in March 1989 Sterland had played 347 games for Sheffield Wednesday and scored 49 goals. His three goals in nine games helped a Rangers side managed by Graeme Souness win their second Scottish league title in three seasons, and their 39th overall.

However, on 1 July 1989 Sterland returned to England when he linked up with his former Sheffield Wednesday manager Howard Wilkinson at Leeds United as he built a side geared for promotion. Sterland became an immediate favourite with the Elland Road fans as his five goals in 42 league games that season sealed Leeds the Second Division title and promotion back to the First Division after eight years away. He helped Leeds make an immediate impact on their return to the top flight as they finished fourth – though this was slightly soured by the fact that although the ban on English clubs in Europe had now been lifted, Leeds were unable to compete in the UEFA Cup as English clubs were only being gradually phased back into the competition with just runners-up Liverpool being admitted for the 1991–92 competition.

Sterland was a key player in Leeds United's title triumph of the 1991–92 season – the last of the First Division before the creation of the FA Premier League as the top division of English football – as he scored six goals in 31 league games. Sterland played three games in the new Premier League before suffering an ankle injury in the autumn of 1992.

After failing to make an adequate recovery from the injury, he announced his retirement from playing in January 1994.

== International career ==
In 1988 Sterland won his only England cap in a friendly against Saudi Arabia. Earlier in his career he had helped England win the 1984 UEFA Under-21 Championship, in which he scored a goal in the final against Spain. At the time of his England cap in 1988, he was the first Sheffield Wednesday player to be capped by England since the 1960s.

== After retirement ==
Sterland went on to be player/manager with non-league Boston United and after a spell playing for Denaby United was appointed manager of Stalybridge Celtic in December 1997. He also starred in the football film When Saturday Comes, ironically playing the captain of Sheffield United.

His autobiography Boozing, Betting & Brawling (Green Umbrella Publishing), was co-written with Sheffield-based journalist Nick Johnson and was published in August 2008. His former Sheffield Wednesday and Leeds United manager Howard Wilkinson wrote the foreword.

== Honours ==
Rangers

- Scottish Premier Division: 1988–89

Leeds United

- Football League First Division: 1991–92
- Football League Second Division: 1989–90

Denaby United

- NCEFL Premier Division: 1996–97

England U21

- UEFA U-21 Championship: 1984
