= Carl Shutt =

English footballer (born 1961)

Personal information
- Full name: Carl Steven Shutt
- Date of birth: 10 October 1961 (age 65)
- Place of birth: Sheffield, England
- Height: 5 ft 11 in (1.80 m)
- Position: Striker

Senior career*
Years	Team	Apps	(Gls)
1982–1985	Spalding United		
1985–1987	Sheffield Wednesday	40	(16)
1987–1989	Bristol City	46	(10)
1989–1993	Leeds United	79	(17)
1990	→ Malmö FF (loan)	1	(0)
1993–1994	Birmingham City	26	(4)
1993–1994	→ Manchester City (loan)	6	(0)
1994–1997	Bradford City	89	(16)
1997–1999	Darlington	54	(9)
1999–2003	Kettering Town	76	(5)
2004–2005	Bradford Park Avenue	13	(1)

Managerial career
- 2001: Kettering Town (player/caretaker manager)
- 2001–2003: Kettering Town (player-manager)
- 2004–2005: Bradford Park Avenue (player-manager)
- * Club domestic league appearances and goals

Carl Steven Shutt (born 10 October 1961) is an English former professional footballer who made 338 appearances in the Football League and Premier League playing as a striker.

== Playing career ==
Shutt's league career started at the relatively late age of 23. He was spotted by Howard Wilkinson while playing for Spalding United and enjoyed two relatively successful seasons with Sheffield Wednesday. With the manager leaving the club, Shutt joined Bristol City and again had two relatively successful seasons. It was not long before Wilkinson recalled him and arranged to swap Bob Taylor and £50,000 to get his man again, on cue for Leeds United's push to promotion.

Shutt made an instant impact at Leeds with a hat-trick in his first game. He became a fans' favourite with tireless running and unwillingness to give up any cause. Following promotion and the successful pairing of Lee Chapman and Rod Wallace, Shutt remained a popular figure and was frequently used as a substitute. At Leeds he played in fourteen games and scored twice (against Chelsea and Everton) as they won the First Division in 1992, meaning Shutt was eligible for a medal.

Perhaps the defining moment of Shutt's Leeds career came at the Nou Camp against VfB Stuttgart in 1992, in a replayed European Cup game. Within a couple of minutes of coming on as a substitute, he scored the winner.

After leaving Leeds in 1993 with more than 100 appearances and 25 goals, he played for Birmingham City and had a very brief spell at Manchester City before settling at Bradford City in 1994. In three seasons with the Bantams, Shutt scored 15 goals before moving on to Darlington where again he spent three seasons, scoring nine goals.

== Managerial career ==
He then joined non-league Kettering Town, initially as a player. In February 2001 he took over as caretaker manager. Though unable to avoid relegation, his position was made permanent and he led them back to the Conference at the first attempt. In the 2002–03 season, he managed the club through a very difficult period with the club up for sale and facing administration. It was a losing battle and when relegation was confirmed, the club decided to terminate his contract.

In 2004, Shutt became manager of Bradford Park Avenue and managed to steer them to the Conference North league. He continued to play (and score) occasionally. His contract was not renewed following Bradford's relegation at the end of the 2004–05 season. Carl now works for Hays Travel in their Meadowhall branch and is a top selling travel agent

== Honours ==
Leeds United

- Football League First Division: 1991–92
- Football League Second Division: 1989–90

Bradford City

- Football League Second Division play-offs: 1996
