= Chris Fairclough =

English footballer and coach

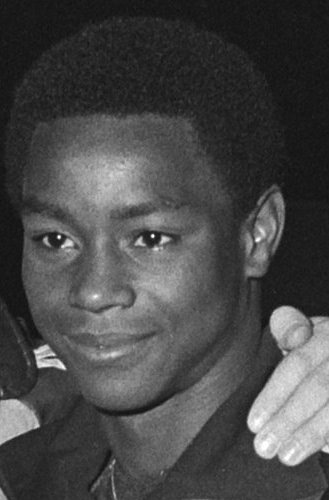
- Fairclough in 1983

Personal information
- Full name: Courtney Huw Fairclough
- Date of birth: 12 April 1964 (age 62)
- Place of birth: Nottingham, England
- Height: 5 ft 11 in (1.80 m)
- Position: Central defender

Senior career*
Years	Team	Apps	(Gls)
1981–1987	Nottingham Forest	107	(1)
1987–1989	Tottenham Hotspur	60	(5)
1989	→ Leeds United (loan)	3	(0)
1989–1995	Leeds United	189	(21)
1995–1998	Bolton Wanderers	90	(8)
1998–1999	Notts County	16	(1)
1999	→ York City (loan)	11	(0)
1999–2001	York City	26	(0)
Total		502	(36)

International career
1984–1988	England U21	7	(1)
- * Club domestic league appearances and goals

Courtney Huw Fairclough, commonly known as Chris Fairclough, (born 12 April 1964) is an English football coach and former professional footballer.

As a player, he was a defender from 1981 to 2001. He most notably played for Nottingham Forest and Leeds United. He also played for Tottenham Hotspur, Bolton Wanderers, Notts County and York City. He was capped 7 times by the England U21 side. His time spent with both Leeds and Bolton saw him appear as a Premier League player.

He later became a coach and was the assistant manager back with Nottingham Forest in 2011, before later taking up a role as youth team coach for Charlton Athletic.

== Club career ==
He joined his hometown club Nottingham Forest in 1981, where he won the first of his seven England under-21 international caps. Forest however allowed the defender's contract to expire and he had his pick of clubs. Having made 134 appearances and scored 2 goals for Forest, he moved to Tottenham Hotspur in June 1987, with the transfer fee set by tribunal at £387,000. Fairclough proved to be a solid and reliable centre-back, being an ever-present throughout the 1987–88 season. The 1988–89 season however was blighted by injury for Fairclough and he only made 20 league appearances.

After failing to reclaim his place in Terry Venables' team, Fairclough joined Leeds United on loan in March 1989. In the summer of 1989 he made the move permanent, moving for a fee of £500,000. He was immediately installed at the heart of the defence, and the team gained promotion, winning the Second Division Championship in 1990 and went on to win the First Division title two years later - the last top division title before the formation of the FA Premier League. In his six years at Elland Road, he was almost ever-present and immensely popular with the fans, picking up Player of the Year in 1990. His partnership with Chris Whyte was a key factor in the Championship win.

However, he eventually lost his place in the side and moved to Bolton Wanderers in July 1995 for the same fee he joined the club for, having made 240 appearances scoring 23 goals. Over a period of three years he made 106 appearances scoring 8 goals. He joined Bolton on their promotion to the Premier League, and although he was unable to keep them there, he helped them return at the first attempt by winning the Division One title in 1997 with 100 goals and 98 points, though again they were ultimately relegated from the Premier League after just one season.

He had a spell at Notts County (1998–1999, scoring once against his soon to be employers, York City) before joining York City in 1999 where he stayed until he retired in 2001.

== International career ==
Fairclough was capped seven times at under-21 level for England during the 1980s, but never played for his country at senior level.

== Coaching career ==
He now lives outside Nottingham and worked for Nottingham Forest as an assistant first team coach having previously coached the under-17 team. He left in June 2011 when his contract was terminated by the club following the departure of Billy Davies.

In July 2012 he was appointed as Professional Development Phase Coach (U16-U18) at Charlton Athletic.

== Personal life ==
Fairclough's nephew is former Notts County striker Ben Fairclough.

== Honours ==
Leeds United

- Football League First Division: 1991–92
- Football League Second Division: 1989–90
- FA Charity Shield: 1992

Bolton Wanderers

- Football League First Division: 1996–97

Individual

- PFA Team of the Year: 1989–90 Second Division
