= Leslie Silver =

British executive and university chancellor (1925-2014)

- Born: 22 January 1925; London, England
- Died: 29 December 2014 (aged 89)
- Occupations: Businessman; Chancellor of Leeds Metropolitan University
- Spouse(s): Anita (m. 1946–1983; her death); Sheila (m. 1984–2013; her death)

Leslie Howard Silver, OBE (22 January 1925 – 29 December 2014) was a British executive who was chairman of Leeds United football club and chancellor of Leeds Metropolitan University. He was the founder of Silver Paint and Lacquer, later known as Kalon Group PLC, from which he retired in 1991.

== Early life ==
Silver was born in London on 22 January 1925 as a grandson to Jewish immigrants from Poland.

== War service ==
Leslie Silver was born and brought up in Walthamstow, east London, a "poor, working-class background", where his father worked in a clothing factory as a pattern cutter and designer. Silver left school, aged 14, at Easter 1939 and worked in a bookshop. In 1940, after the clothing factory his father worked in was bombed, the family moved to Leeds where his father was employed by Sumrie in the city's thriving clothing trade. Silver volunteered for the RAF in 1943 at the age of 17.

After training as aircrew, he joined Bomber Command in February 1944 as a flight engineer. He flew the full quota of 250 operational hours with 138, 161, 291 and 356 Squadrons, consisting of more than 40 operations in Europe and 20 in the Far East. In the Far East, missions included dropping supplies into Changi gaol. Silver left the RAF in 1947, aged 22. In 2013, at the age of 88, he was awarded the Bomber Command Clasp.

== Business ==
After the war Silver returned to Leeds and went into business, laying the foundation for his life’s work, the highly successful Leyland Paints company, which began in 1947 as the Silver Paint and Lacquer Company Limited.

Silver founded the Silver Paint and Lacquer Co.—SPL, as it became known—in 1947 when he left the RAF. Using his £1,000 gratuity and a loan, Silver manufactured nitrocellulose thinners, mainly for the car industry. In the 1950s the product range was extended to include decorative paint products. Initially SPL was based in Leeds, but by the 1960s the factory lacked sufficient space and in 1963 moved to larger premises in Batley. In 1976 and 1981 respectively the company took over the Leeds Paint Manufacturing Company and Bestobell Paints. In 1982 the company was renamed Kalon. The word is derived from Greek and means "for the greater good". In 1982 Silver was awarded the Order of the British Empire for services to export and named Yorkshire Businessman of the Year in 1983. During his long service in the paint industry, he held national office as:

- President of the Oil and Colour Chemists Association (1973–75)
- President of the Paint Industries Club (1978–79)
- President of the Paintmakers Association of Great Britain Limited (1979–80)
- President of the Paint Research Association (1981–82)

It was the first time any one individual had served as president of the four associations relating to the surface coating industry. In 1983 the company moved again, this time from Batley to the much larger (and current) premises off Huddersfield Road in Birstall. In 1985, Kalon acquired Leyland Paints. The reverse takeover led to the flotation of Kalon on the London Stock Exchange and the formation of Kalon Group PLC. Silver had been, since June 1998, a director of Fifth Argyll Ltd., a Harrogate-based property company.

== Football ==
Silver joined the board of Leeds United A.F.C. in 1981, becoming chairman in 1983, a post he held until 1996.

Although Leeds were relegated to the Second Division just after Silver became chairman, the club won promotion from the Second to the First Division in 1990 and won the top-flight league title in 1992 – the season before the introduction of the new FA Premier League.

More than 30 years on, Leeds United remain the last team to win the top flight English football title with an English manager, Howard Wilkinson.

By the time Silver left Elland Road in 1996, he had spent millions on the transformation of the club's stadium into a modern 40,000 seater venue, as well as signing a host of key players who played in the promotion and title winning teams.

Silver later served as president of Harrogate Football Club and honorary president of amateur club Garforth A.F.C.

== Leeds Metropolitan University ==
In 1988, Silver was invited to chair a formation committee of the then Leeds Polytechnic, subsequently becoming chairman of the board of governors of the Polytechnic, which became Leeds Metropolitan University. On 1 January 1999, he became the university's first chancellor. He resigned early 2005. A building on the campus is named after him. The University library, named after his late wife Mrs Sheila Silver.

Sporting positions
Preceded by Manny Cussins	Leeds United chairman 1983–1996	Succeeded by Bill Fotherby
