= 1994–95 Leeds United A.F.C. season =

1994–95 season of Leeds United

Leeds United
1994–95 season
- Chairman: Leslie Silver
- Manager: Howard Wilkinson
- Stadium: Elland Road
- Premier League: 5th
- FA Cup: Fifth round
- League Cup: Second round
- Top goalscorer: League: Tony Yeboah (12); All: Tony Yeboah (13)
- Highest home attendance: 39,426 vs Blackburn Rovers (15 April 1995, Premier League)
- Lowest home attendance: 7,844 vs Mansfield Town (21 September 1994, League Cup)
- Average home league attendance: 30,959

The 1994–95 season saw Leeds United competing in the Premier League (known as the FA Carling Premiership for sponsorship reasons) for a third successive season.

== Competitions ==
=== Premier League ===
==== League table ====
Pos	Team	Pld	W	D	L	GF	GA	GD	Pts	Qualification or relegation
3	Nottingham Forest	42	22	11	9	72	43	+29	77	Qualification for the UEFA Cup first round (Note: Leeds United were rewarded entry to the UEFA Cup through UEFA Fair Play ranking.)
4	Liverpool	42	21	11	10	65	37	+28	74	Qualification for the UEFA Cup first round
5	Leeds United	42	20	13	9	59	38	+21	73	Qualification for the UEFA Cup first round
6	Newcastle United	42	20	12	10	67	47	+20	72	
7	Tottenham Hotspur	42	16	14	12	66	58	+8	62	Qualification for the Intertoto Cup group stage

Source: Premier League
Rules for classification: 1) points; 2) goal difference; 3) number of goals scored.
Notes:

Results summary

Overall								Home						Away					
Pld	W	D	L	GF	GA	GD	Pts	W	D	L	GF	GA	GD	W	D	L	GF	GA	GD
42	20	13	9	59	38	+21	73	13	5	3	35	15	+20	7	8	6	24	23	+1

Source: Statto

Results by round

Round	1	2	3	4	5	6	7	8	9	10	11	12	13	14	15	16	17	18	19	20	21	22	23	24	25	26	27	28	29	30	31	32	33	34	35	36	37	38	39	40	41	42
Ground	A	H	H	A	H	A	A	H	A	H	H	A	A	H	A	H	A	H	A	H	H	A	H	H	A	A	H	A	H	A	A	H	A	A	H	A	H	A	H	H	H	A
Result	D	W	L	W	W	L	D	W	L	D	W	W	L	W	L	W	L	D	W	D	L	D	D	W	D	D	W	D	L	W	W	W	L	D	W	W	D	W	W	W	W	D
Position	13	4	8	6	6	6	8	6	9	9	9	6	6	6	6	6	8	7	6	6	8	7	8	7	7	6	7	6	7	7	6	6	6	6	6	6	6	6	6	6	4	5

Source: Statto.com
A = Away; H = Home; W = Win; D = Draw; L = Loss

=== Premier League ===
Date	Opponent	Venue	Result	Attendance	Scorers
20 August 1994	West Ham United	Away	0–0	18,810	
23 August 1994	Arsenal	Home	1–0	34,218	Whelan
27 August 1994	Chelsea	Home	2–3	32,212	Masinga, Whelan
30 August 1994	Crystal Palace	Away	2–1	15,212	White, Whelan
10 September 1994	Manchester United	Home	2–1	39,396	Deane, Wetherall
17 September 1994	Coventry City	Away	1–2	15,389	Speed
26 September 1994	Sheffield Wednesday	Away	1–1	23,227	McAllister
1 October 1994	Manchester City	Home	2–0	30,938	Whelan (2)
8 October 1994	Norwich City	Away	1–2	17,390	Wallace
15 October 1994	Tottenham Hotspur	Home	1–1	39,224	Deane
24 October 1994	Leicester City	Home	2–1	28,547	McAllister, Whelan
29 October 1994	Southampton	Away	3–1	15,202	Wallace (2), O.G
1 November 1994	Ipswich Town	Away	0–2	15,956	
5 November 1994	Wimbledon	Home	3–1	27,284	Wetherall, White, Speed
19 November 1994	Queens Park Rangers	Away	2–3	17,416	Deane, O.G
26 November 1994	Nottingham Forest	Home	1–0	38,191	Whelan
5 December 1994	Everton	Away	0–3	25,897	
10 December 1994	West Ham United	Home	2–2	28,987	Deane, Worthington
17 December 1994	Arsenal	Away	3–1	38,098	Masinga (2), Deane
26 December 1994	Newcastle United	Home	0–0	39,337	
31 December 1994	Liverpool	Home	0–2	38,563	
2 January 1995	Aston Villa	Away	0–0	35,028	
14 January 1995	Southampton	Home	0–0	28,953	
24 January 1995	Queens Park Rangers	Home	4–0	28,780	Masinga (2), White, Deane
1 February 1995	Blackburn Rovers	Away	1–1	28,561	McAllister
4 February 1995	Wimbledon	Away	0–0	10,211	
22 February 1995	Everton	Home	1–0	30,793	Yeboah
25 February 1995	Manchester City	Away	0–0	22,892	
4 March 1995	Sheffield Wednesday	Home	0–1	33,750	
11 March 1995	Chelsea	Away	3–0	20,174	Yeboah (2), McAllister
15 March 1995	Leicester City	Away	3–1	20,068	Yeboah (2), Palmer
18 March 1995	Coventry City	Home	3–0	29,179	Yeboah, Wallace, O.G
22 March 1995	Nottingham Forest	Away	0–3	26,299	
2 April 1995	Manchester United	Away	0–0	43,712	
5 April 1995	Ipswich Town	Home	4–0	28,600	Yeboah (3), Speed
9 April 1995	Liverpool	Away	1–0	37,454	Deane
15 April 1995	Blackburn Rovers	Home	1–1	39,426	Deane
17 April 1995	Newcastle United	Away	2–1	35,262	McAllister, Yeboah
29 April 1995	Aston Villa	Home	1–0	32,955	Palmer
6 May 1995	Norwich City	Home	2–1	31,981	Palmer, McAllister
9 May 1995	Crystal Palace	Home	3–1	30,963	Yeboah (2), Wetherall
14 May 1995	Tottenham Hotspur	Away	1–1	33,040	Deane

=== FA Cup ===
Round	Date	Opponent	Venue	Result	Attendance	Goalscorers
Third Round	7 January 1995	Walsall	Away	1–1	8,619	Wetherall
Third Round Replay	17 January 1995	Walsall	Home	5–2 (a.e.t.)	17,694	Deane, Wetherall, Masinga (3)
Fourth Round	28 January 1995	Oldham Athletic	Home	3–2	25,010	White, Palmer, Masinga
Fifth Round	19 February 1995	Manchester United	Away	1–3	42,744	Yeboah

=== League Cup ===
Round	Date	Opponent	Venue	Result	Attendance	Goalscorers
Second Round First-Leg	21 September 1994	Mansfield Town	Home	0–1	7,844	
Second Round Second-Leg	4 October 1994	Mansfield Town	Away	0–0 (lost 0–1 on agg)	7,227	

== Statistics ==
No.	Pos.	Name	League		FA Cup		League Cup		Total		Discipline	
No.	Pos.	Name	Apps	Goals	Apps	Goals	Apps	Goals	Apps	Goals	Yellow card	Red card
1	GK	(England) John Lukic	42	0	4	0	2	0	48	0	0	0
2	DF	(Republic of Ireland) Gary Kelly	42	0	4	0	2	0	48	0	6	0
3	DF	(England) Tony Dorigo	28	0	1	0	0+1	0	29+1	0	2	0
4	DF	(England) Carlton Palmer	39	3	3	1	2	0	44	4	10	0
5	DF	(England) Chris Fairclough	1+4	0	0	0	2	0	3+4	0	0	0
6	DF	(England) David Wetherall	38	3	4	1	1	0	43	4	6	0
7	MF	(Scotland) Gordon Strachan	1+5	0	0	0	1	0	2+5	0	0	0
8	FW	(England) Rod Wallace	30+2	4	2+1	0	2	0	34+3	4	6	0
9	FW	(England) Brian Deane	33+2	9	3	1	1+1	0	37+3	10	9	0
10	MF	(Scotland) Gary McAllister	41	6	4	0	2	0	47	6	3	0
11	MF	(Wales) Gary Speed	39	3	4	0	2	0	45	3	5	0
12	DF	(England) John Pemberton	22+5	0	4	0	0+1	0	26+6	0	7	0
14	FW	(England) David White	18+5	3	3	1	0	0	21+5	4	3	0
15	DF	(Northern Ireland) Nigel Worthington	21+6	1	3+1	0	2	0	26+7	1	2	0
17	MF	(England) Mark Tinkler	3	0	0	0	0	0	3	0	0	0
19	FW	(England) Noel Whelan	18+5	7	2	0	2	0	20+5	7	3	0
20	DF	(England) Kevin Sharp	0+2	0	0	0	0	0	0+2	0	0	0
21	FW	(Ghana) Tony Yeboah	16+2	12	0+2	1	0	0	16+4	13	0	0
23	MF	(England) Andy Couzens	2+2	0	0	0	0	0	2+2	0	1	0
26	FW	(South Africa) Phil Masinga	15+7	5	2+2	4	1	0	18+2	9	1	0
27	DF	(South Africa) Lucas Radebe	9+3	0	1+1	0	0+1	0	10+5	0	2	0

== Transfers ==
=== In ===
Date	Pos.	Name	From	Fee
30 June 1994	DF	(England) Carlton Palmer	(England) Sheffield Wednesday	£2,600,000
4 July 1994	DF	(Northern Ireland) Nigel Worthington	(England) Sheffield Wednesday	£325,000
3 August 1994	FW	(South Africa) Phil Masinga	(South Africa) Mamelodi Sundowns	£275,000
5 September 1994	DF	(South Africa) Lucas Radebe	(South Africa) Kaizer Chiefs	£250,000
5 January 1995	FW	(Ghana) Tony Yeboah	(Germany) Eintracht Frankfurt	£3,400,000

=== Out ===
Date	Pos.	Name	To	Fee
1 June 1994	FW	(Norway) Frank Strandli	(Norway) SK Brann	£100,000
30 June 1994	DF	(England) Jon Newsome	(England) Norwich City	£1,000,000
11 August 1994	DF	(England) Ray Wallace	(England) Stoke City	Free
8 October 1994	DF	(Scotland) Mark Humphries	(England) Bristol City	Free
28 October 1994	MF	(England) Steve Hodge	(England) Queens Park Rangers	£300,000
5 January 1995	MF	(Wales) Ryan Nicholls	(Wales) Cardiff City	Free
22 March 1995	MF	(Scotland) Gordon Strachan	(England) Coventry City	Free

=== Loan out ===
Date from	Date to	Pos.	Name	To
1 August 1994	1 October 1994	MF	(England) Steve Hodge	(England) Derby County
1 September 1994	1 October 1994	FW	(England) Jamie Forrester	(England) Southend United
23 December 1994	23 January 1995	GK	(England) Paul Pettinger	(England) Torquay United
10 March 1995	31 May 1995	FW	(England) Jamie Forrester	(England) Grimsby Town
