= Howard Wilkinson =

English footballer & manager (born 1943)

Howard Wilkinson OBE
Personal information
- Full name: Howard Wilkinson
- Date of birth: 13 November 1943 (age 83)
- Place of birth: Sheffield, England
- Position: Winger

Senior career*
Years	Team	Apps	(Gls)
- Hallam
–1962	Sheffield United	0	(0)
1962–1966	Sheffield Wednesday	22	(3)
1966–1971	Brighton & Hove Albion	129	(18)
1971–1976	Boston United	219	(34)

Managerial career
- 1975–1976: Boston United
- 1976–1977: Mossley
- 1979–1982: England C
- 1982–1983: Notts County
- 1983–1988: Sheffield Wednesday
- 1988–1996: Leeds United
- 1999: England (caretaker)
- 1999–2001: England U21
- 2000: England (caretaker)
- 2002–2003: Sunderland
- 2004: Shanghai Shenhua
- * Club domestic league appearances and goals

Howard Wilkinson OBE (born 13 November 1943) is an English former footballer and manager. Despite having a low-profile playing career, Wilkinson embarked on a successful managerial career. He won the First Division championship in 1992 with Leeds United, the final season before the creation of the Premier League. As FA Technical Director he was instrumental in the planning and development of English football's first National Football Centre. He was the last English manager to win the First Division championship in 1992. Since the Premier League's formation in 1992–93, no English manager has won the title. He later had spells as caretaker manager of the England senior and U21 teams.

Wilkinson was a founding member of the League Managers Association and served as its chairman from its formation in 1992, until his retirement in 2024.

He was inducted into the National Football Museum Hall of Fame in 2025.

== Playing career ==
Born in the Netherthorpe district of Sheffield, Yorkshire, Wilkinson began his playing career with local team Sheffield United, before joining cross-city rivals Sheffield Wednesday, signing for them on 25 June 1962.

After making just 22 league appearances, he joined Brighton & Hove Albion on 9 July 1966 where he played over a hundred league matches as a winger. He left the club in 1971.

His final club was Boston United. Whilst there, he won several Northern Premier League titles. It was at the Pilgrims where he began his managerial career, being appointed player manager in 1975. He won two more Northern Premier League titles as manager. In December 1976, he was enticed away from Boston to join Mossley as player-manager and guided them up the table to finish 9th, being unbeaten in 19 successive games. He played 30 matches for the club, scoring one goal.

He has a degree in education from what is now Sheffield Hallam University, where he graduated from in 1975.

== Managerial career ==
=== Notts County ===
Wilkinson began his full-time coaching career in December 1979 at Notts County when he was appointed a coach. He was taken on and tutored by County's manager Jimmy Sirrel. After Sirrell became the club's general manager in August 1982, Wilkinson became team manager for the 1982–83 season and County managed a reasonable return of 52 points, achieving a finish of 15th in the First Division.

=== Sheffield Wednesday ===
In June 1983, Wilkinson dropped down a division to become manager of Sheffield Wednesday, where he established his reputation as a manager despite never having been a big-name player. Wednesday won promotion from the Second Division in his first season and Wilkinson maintained their place in England's top flight for the next four years – with a highest finish of fifth in the 1985–86 season.

=== Leeds United ===
Wilkinson's greatest success as a manager came after moving to Wednesday's Yorkshire rivals Leeds United in October 1988. He soon drilled discipline into a lacklustre squad and earned the affectionate nickname "Sergeant Wilko", a play on the old TV character Sergeant Bilko. The team won the Second Division in the 1989–90 season, after the signings of Gordon Strachan who became captain, hardman Vinnie Jones (who Wilkinson guided to a whole season with only three yellow cards), Mel Sterland, Chris Fairclough and Lee Chapman. Following the promotion, Wilkinson immediately offloaded Jones and brought in Gary McAllister from Leicester City and John Lukic was brought back from Arsenal. He also helped players who had come up through the youth team, Gary Speed and David Batty, to mature to the new level of football.

In Leeds' first season in the First Division, they performed very well for a newly promoted team and ended the season fourth in the league. Wilkinson felt further improvement was required on the squad and brought in Rod Wallace, Tony Dorigo and Steve Hodge, finalising his best squad with Eric Cantona in February 1992. Leeds won the last championship of the old style First Division in 1992. As of 2026, Wilkinson is the last English manager to have coached a team to the English league championship title.

However, his subsequent time at Leeds was less successful. Leeds finished 17th in the 1992–93 season, which is among the worst performances by a team who were reigning English champions. Leeds improved with consecutive fifth-place finishes in the 1993–94 and 1994–95 seasons, the latter earning the club a UEFA Cup spot. Leeds also reached the final of the League Cup in 1996, which they lost 3–0 to Aston Villa. Following a poor start to the 1996–97 season, including a 4–0 home defeat to bitter rivals Manchester United, on 9 September 1996, Wilkinson was sacked.

Wilkinson made the decision to sell Cantona to Alex Ferguson's Manchester United on 27 November 1992 for £1.2m. The Frenchman went on to become a linchpin in the side that won four Premier League titles in five seasons.

Wilkinson was instrumental in the opening of Leeds' first modern academy and training facility at Thorp Arch in 1994 known as The Grange, named after Barcelona's La Masia, translated in English as The Farmhouse. Intended as a base to nurture a nucleus of players to challenge for domestic and European honours by the mid-2000s. Wilkinson's plans for Leeds were never fully realised, however, he later applied this blueprint to the national game when implementing the Academy System as FA technical director.

In December 1999, Wilkinson revealed that Arsenal had made an approach for him during the summer of 1995, when they were searching for a successor to George Graham, who had been sacked for accepting an illegal payment three years earlier. However, the Leeds board rejected Arsenal's approach for him and Bruce Rioch was appointed instead.

Shortly after his exit from Elland Road, Manchester City chairman Francis Lee expressed interest in appointing Wilkinson as manager of the Maine Road club a few months after their relegation from the Premier League. However, when Wilkinson turned down the approach, Lee then turned to Frank Clark, who had resigned as Nottingham Forest manager.

=== The Football Association ===
Four months after leaving Leeds, in January 1997, Wilkinson was hired by the sport's governing body in England, the Football Association, to act as its Technical Director, overseeing coaching and other training programmes at all levels of the game. Whilst at Leeds, Wilkinson had developed a ten-year plan to create an "English La Masia" at Thorp Arch. In his role with the FA, Wilkinson applied this blueprint on a larger scale to the national game, developing the academy system and persuading the FA to begin the National Football Centre project. Wilkinson based the plans for the National Football Centre on the French system at Clairefontaine which nurtured the 1998 FIFA World Cup and UEFA Euro 2000 winners. In 1997, Wilkinson published the Charter for Quality which was the basis for which all English academies were to train future stars.

In his position as Technical Director of the FA, he managed the England team on a caretaker basis in 1999 for a friendly against France, following the sacking of Glenn Hoddle. Following this, he acted for a time as the permanent coach of the England under-21 team, controversially selecting himself to replace Hoddle's choice of manager, Peter Taylor. Wilkinson was unsuccessful in this role; despite inheriting a team who were unbeaten and yet to concede a goal, he lost three of his six matches in charge. Wilkinson resigned from the post in June 2001, to be replaced by David Platt (Taylor would end up back in charge three years later). He returned to the role of caretaker of the senior team in October 2000 following the resignation of Hoddle's permanent successor Kevin Keegan, overseeing a 0–0 draw in a World Cup qualifying match against Finland.

=== Sunderland ===
In October 2002, he left his role as FA Technical Director in order to return to club management at relegation threatened Premier League side Sunderland, with Steve Cotterill as his assistant. However, his time there was a disappointment, being unable to improve the form of a struggling side, and he departed on 10 March 2003. Sunderland eventually ended the season at the bottom of the Premier League with a then league-history-worst total of 19 points. He won two league games out of a possible twenty with his worst moment being a 3–1 home defeat to Charlton Athletic on 1 February 2003 during which Sunderland scored three own goals within seven minutes.

At one point during his tenure, he was once asked some very pointed questions by a BBC Radio 5 Live reporter about a far from perfect performance. Wilkinson is said to have snapped and asked him what qualified him, as a mere reporter, to question professionals in this way. "Forty-three England caps, fifteen as captain" came the reply. The reporter concerned was Jimmy Armfield.

=== Later career ===
Wilkinson briefly returned to management in March 2004, taking charge of Chinese club Shanghai Shenhua on a short-term contract, but left two months later for personal reasons. In October 2004, he was temporarily appointed as first team coach of Leicester City, following the departures of manager Micky Adams and coach Alan Cork. Wilkinson returned to Notts County in December 2004 where he became a non-executive director. He held a coaching role as technical director from June 2006 until September 2007 when he left the club altogether.

On 9 January 2009, Wilkinson was confirmed as the new Technical Adviser of Sheffield Wednesday. Upon the resignation of Lee Strafford on 17 May 2010, Wilkinson became the interim chairman of the club. He confronted fans after they protested against the club following a 1–0 defeat to Southampton. Notably, Wilkinson's primary function in his role was to negotiate the essential investment that Wednesday required to avoid the threat of administration, when a winding up petition was to be presented by HMRC on 17 November 2010. This was achieved when Milan Mandarić was revealed as the new owner of the club. Mandarić, then the owner of Leicester City, sold the club to Vichai and Aiyawatt Srivaddhanaprabha, as Football League rules prevented him from being the chairman of two different clubs. Wilkinson stayed on at Wednesday in a non-executive directorial role, until he resigned in early 2011.

Wilkinson helped author Jilly Cooper with research for her 2023 novel Tackle!

== Personal life ==
His son Ben was also a professional footballer, and is currently part of the coaching staff at Derby County.

Wilkinson was also a PE teacher at Abbeydale Grange school, Sheffield, whilst playing semi-professional football for Boston United. Wilkinson was appointed Officer of the Order of the British Empire (OBE) in the 2024 New Year Honours for services to association football and charity.

== Managerial statistics ==
Team	Nat	From	To	Record				
Team	Nat	From	To	G	W	D	L	Win %
Boston United	(England)	February 1975	November 1976	101	50	30	21	49.50
Notts County	(England)	July 1982	June 1983	44	17	7	20	38.64
Sheffield Wednesday	(England)	June 1983	October 1988	262	118	70	74	45.04
Leeds United	(England)	October 1988	September 1996	410	176	122	112	42.93
England	(England)	1999	1999	1	0	0	1	0.00
England U21	(England)	1999	2001	0	0	0	0	—
England	(England)	2000	2000	1	0	1	0	0.00
Sunderland	(England)	October 2002	March 2003	27	4	8	15	14.81
Shanghai Shenhua	(China)	2004	2004	6	5	0	1	83.33
Total				852	370	237	245	43.43

== Honours ==
=== As a player ===
Boston United

- Northern Premier League: 1972–73, 1973–74

=== As a manager ===
Boston United

- Northern Premier League Challenge Cup: 1975–76
- Northern Premier League Challenge Shield: 1975–76
- Lincolnshire Senior Cup: 1976–77

Mossley

- Manchester Senior Cup: 1976–77

Sheffield Wednesday

- Football League Second Division runner-up: 1983–84

Leeds United

- Football League Second Division: 1989–90
- Football League First Division: 1991–92
- FA Charity Shield: 1992
- Football League Cup runner-up: 1995–96

Individual

- Premier League Manager of the Month: April 1995
- English Football Hall of Fame: 2025

== See also ==
- List of English football championship-winning managers
