= M69 derby =

Association football rivalry

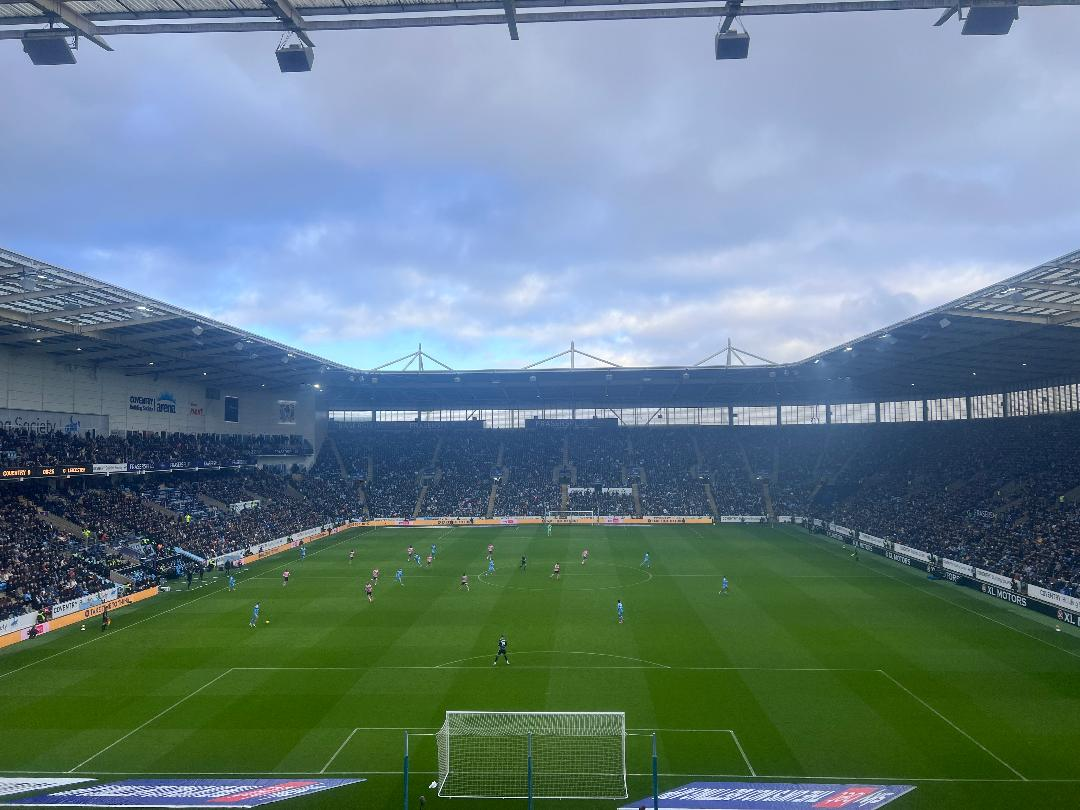
- The January 2026 M69 Derby at Coventry Building Society Arena, which Coventry won 2–1.
- Location: Midlands
- Teams: Coventry City; Leicester City
- First meeting: 27 September 1919; Second Division; Leicester 1–0 Coventry
- Latest meeting: 17 January 2026; EFL Championship; Coventry 2–1 Leicester
- Stadiums: Coventry Building Society Arena (Coventry City); King Power Stadium (Leicester City)

Statistics
- Total meetings: 90
- Most wins: Leicester City (38)
- All-time series: Leicester City: 38; Drawn: 25; Coventry City: 27
- Largest victory: Coventry 1–8 Leicester; Football League Cup (1 December 1964)

The M69 derby is a football match played between Coventry City and Leicester City. It takes its name from the motorway that connects Coventry and Leicester, which are only 24 miles (38 km) apart.

The M69 derby made its return during the 2023–24 season after an eleven-year hiatus, following Leicester's relegation after nine seasons in the Premier League.

== The rise ==
Coventry and Leicester's traditional rivals have historically been considered to be Aston Villa and Nottingham Forest respectively. However, the fixture became increasingly significant between 2001 and 2011 with both clubs' traditional rivals often being in a different league. According to a survey by The Football Pools published in 2008, this fixture is the 26th fiercest rivalry in English football.

In the 2011–12 season Coventry were relegated to League One, meaning the M69 derby would not take place for the first time in eight seasons. A period of turmoil followed for The Sky Blues under their controversial former owners, London based hedge fund SISU Capital as they left their home at the Coventry Building Society Arena twice to play home games in Northampton and Birmingham respectively as well as suffering a further relegation to League Two in 2017.

Whilst Coventry struggled to even survive as a club, Leicester flourished and entered a golden period in their history. After winning promotion back to the Premier League in 2014, The Foxes shocked the entire footballing world by winning the 2015–16 Premier League and would go on to add another trophy to their collection after a 1-0 victory against Chelsea in the 2021 FA Cup final.

Coventry's defeat to Luton Town in the 2023 EFL Championship play-off final coupled with Leicester's relegation from the 2022–23 Premier League the very next day ensured that after an 11-year hiatus the M69 derby would return in the 2023–24 season.

The two sides played each other on the opening weekend of the 2023–24 EFL Championship, Coventry had looked set for a first ever win at the King Power Stadium before two late goals from Kiernan Dewsbury-Hall gave The Foxes a 2-1 win.

In January 2024 Coventry got their first win in the fixture since 2008 as they won a fiery encounter at The Coventry Building Society Arena. Two goals from Callum O'Hare either side of a Milan van Ewijk strike secured a comeback win after Dewsbury-Hall had put Leicester ahead.

The derby was not played in the 2024–25 season as Leicester won immediate promotion back to the Premier League under the stewardship of Enzo Maresca who led them to the Championship title, however it returned again in 2025–26 as the Foxes latest foray into the top flight lasted a solitary season and they were again relegated.

On 21 April 2026, Coventry secured their first second tier title since 1967 in a 5–1 win over Portsmouth. At nearly the exact same time, Leicester was assured of relegation to League One following a 2–2 draw with Hull City.

== Crowd trouble ==
The fixture between the two clubs has historically been marred by incidents of violence. In September 1984, a pitch invasion took place two minutes into a First Division game at Highfield Road. In October 2004, trouble broke out in Coventry with police officers pelted with missiles. In February 2008, up to 100 hooligans were involved in a brawl on a street nearby to the Coventry Building Society Arena. On 3 March 2012, supporters of both clubs clashed on a street in Leicester, with windows on a mini-bus allegedly smashed. During the 2023–24 season, offensive banners were displayed on the M69 motorway ahead of both fixtures.

== Statistics ==
The first fixture between the two clubs was a Second Division game on 27 September 1919 which resulted in a 1–0 win for Leicester. The biggest victory resulted in an 8–1 Leicester victory in the League Cup game at Highfield Road on 4 December 1964.

Coventry have been heavily beaten on two other occasions at Filbert Street, with both matches ending in a 5–1 win for Leicester. The first was in 1924–25, when Arthur Chandler scored a hat-trick, and in 1984–85, when Gary Lineker scored a brace.

Since moving to their current stadium in 2002, Leicester have never been defeated by Coventry. Coventry held the same record at the Coventry Building Society Arena from 2005 to 2011. Coventry were in the Premier League when they last won at Leicester on 7 April 2001.

As of 17 January 2026

Competition	Coventry wins	Draws	Leicester wins
League	25	24	37
FA Cup	2	1	0
League Cup	0	0	1
Total	27	25	38

== Game list (since 1984) ==
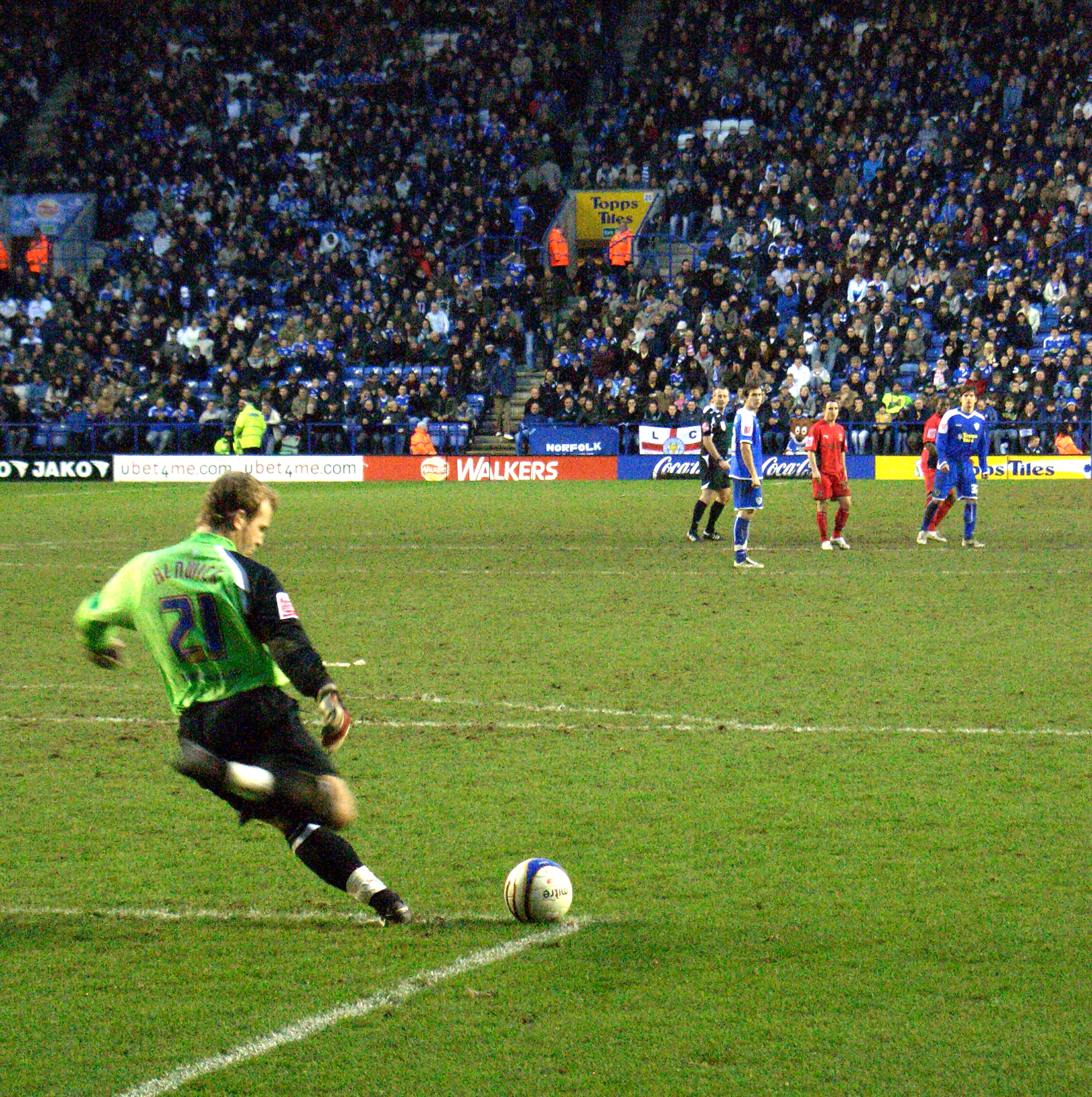
Ben Alnwick takes a goal kick during M69 derby at the Walkers Stadium on 12 January 2008, which Leicester won 2–0.

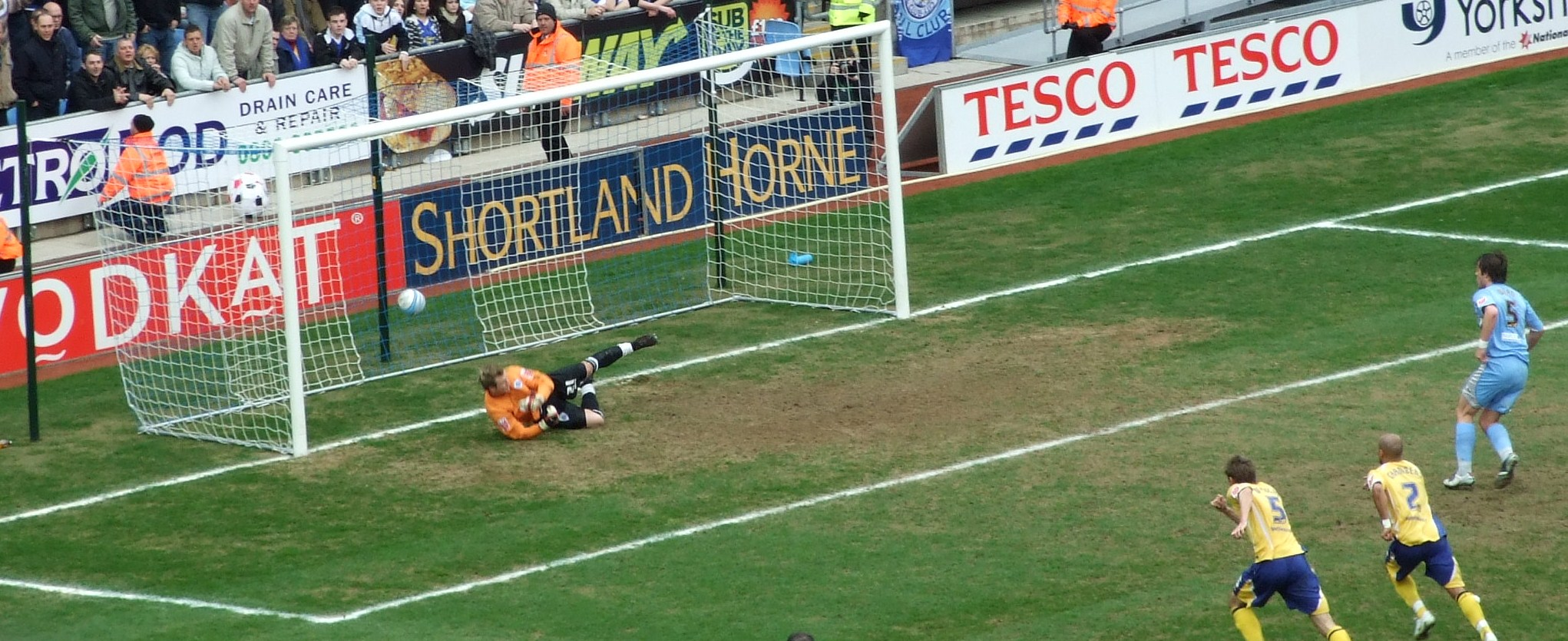
Coventry's Elliott Ward scores a penalty against Leicester on 23 February 2008.

Coventry City win Leicester City win Draw

Date	Competition	Stadium	Score	Leicester scorers	Coventry scorers	Attendance	Ref
Leicester relegated to 2026–27 EFL League One
Coventry promoted to 2026–27 Premier League
17 Jan 2026	Championship	Coventry Building Society Arena	2–1	James	Simms, Wright	31,410
20 Sept 2025	Championship	King Power Stadium	0–0			30,857
Leicester relegated to 2025–26 EFL Championship
Leicester promoted to 2024–25 Premier League
13 Jan 2024	Championship	Coventry Building Society Arena	3–1	Dewsbury-Hall (pen.)	O'Hare (2), van Ewijk	29,914
6 Aug 2023	Championship	King Power Stadium	2–1	Dewsbury-Hall (2)	McFadzean	31,763
Leicester relegated to 2023–24 EFL Championship
Coventry promoted to 2020–21 EFL Championship
Coventry promoted to 2018–19 EFL League One
Coventry relegated to 2017–18 EFL League Two
Leicester promoted to 2014–15 Premier League
Coventry relegated to 2012–13 Football League One
3 Mar 2012	Championship	King Power Stadium	2–0	Nugent, Beckford		25,487
6 Aug 2011	Championship	Ricoh Arena	0–1	Peltier		21,102
26 Feb 2011	Championship	Walkers Stadium	1–1	Naughton	King	25,356
11 Sept 2010	Championship	Ricoh Arena	1–1	King	Platt	20,060
21 Mar 2010	Championship	Walkers Stadium	2–2	King (2)	McPake, Deegan	23,093
3 Oct 2009	Championship	Ricoh Arena	1–1	Waghorn	Clingan	22,209
Leicester promoted to 2009–10 Football League Championship
Leicester relegated to 2008–09 Football League One
23 Feb 2008	Championship	Ricoh Arena	2–0		Ward (pen.), Best	23,129
12 Jan 2008	Championship	Walkers Stadium	2–0	Howard, Hayles		23,905
17 Feb 2007	Championship	Walkers Stadium	3–0	Horsfield (2), Johnson		25,816
18 Aug 2006	Championship	Ricoh Arena	0–0			20,261
17 Apr 2006	Championship	Ricoh Arena	1–1	Stearman	John	26,672
23 Oct 2005	Championship	Walkers Stadium	2–1	de Vries (2)	McSheffrey	22,991
8 Nov 2004	Championship	Walkers Stadium	3–0	Nalis, Tiatto, Heath		22,479
16 Oct 2004	Championship	Highfield Road	1–1	Dublin	Makin (o.g.)	18,054
Leicester relegated to 2004–05 Football League Championship
Leicester promoted to 2003–04 FA Premier League
22 Mar 2003	First Division	Highfield Road	1–2	McKinlay, Scowcroft	Jansen	16,610
29 Oct 2002	First Division	Walkers Stadium	2–1	Taggart, Deane	Partridge	27,139
Leicester relegated to 2002–03 Football League First Division
Coventry relegated to 2001–02 Football League First Division
7 Apr 2001	Premier League	Filbert Street	1–3	Akinbiyi	Bellamy, Carsley, Hartson	19,545
10 Dec 2000	Premier League	Highfield Road	1–0		Bellamy	17,283
27 Nov 1999	Premier League	Highfield Road	0–1	Heskey		22,021
11 Aug 1999	Premier League	Filbert Street	1–0	Izzet (pen.)		19,196
24 Apr 1999	Premier League	Filbert Street	1–0	Marshall		20,224
23 Jan 1999	FA Cup	Filbert Street	0–3		Whelan, Froggatt, Telfer	21,207
28 Nov 1998	Premier League	Highfield Road	1–1	Heskey	Huckerby	19,894
4 Apr 1998	Premier League	Filbert Street	1–1	Wilson	Whelan	21,137
29 Nov 1997	Premier League	Highfield Road	0–2	Fenton, Elliott (pen.)		18,309
8 Mar 1997	Premier League	Highfield Road	0–0			19,220
21 Dec 1996	Premier League	Filbert Street	0–2		Dublin (2)	20,038
Leicester promoted to 1996–97 FA Premier League
Leicester relegated to 1995–96 Football League First Division
25 Feb 1995	Premier League	Highfield Road	4–2	Lowe, Roberts	Flynn (2), Marsh, Ndlovu	20,633
3 Oct 1994	Premier League	Filbert Street	2–2	Roberts (2)	Dublin, Wegerle	19,372
Leicester promoted to 1994–95 FA Premier League
Leicester relegated to 1987–88 Football League Second Division
4 May 1987	First Division	Filbert Street	1–1	Ramsey	Gynn	14,903
6 Dec 1986	First Division	Highfield Road	1–0	Regis		12,320
8 Mar 1986	First Division	Filbert Street	2–1	Smith, McAllister	Pickering	10,744
6 Oct 1985	First Division	Highfield Road	3–0	Gibson, Bowman, Regis		10,959
23 Dec 1985	First Division	Filbert Street	5–1	Lynex, Rennie, Lineker (2), Smith	Micky Gynn	18,016
1 Sept 1984	First Division	Highfield Road	2–0	Latchford, Bennett		13,510

== Represented both clubs ==
=== Played for Coventry, then Leicester ===
- Brian Alderson
- Jeff Blockley
- Conor Chaplin
- Gerry Daly
- Callum Doyle
- Dion Dublin
- Marc Edworthy
- Tommy English
- Márton Fülöp
- Craig Hignett
- Jimmy Holmes
- Chris Kirkland
- James Maddison
- Matt Mills
- Nick Platnauer
- Kasper Schmeichel
- Patrick van Aanholt

=== Played for Leicester, then Coventry ===
- Yakubu Aiyegbeni
- Pegguy Arphexad
- David Bell
- Trevor Benjamin
- Nathan Delfouneso
- Tim Flowers
- Matt Heath
- Andy Impey
- Matty James
- Julian Joachim
- Ken Keyworth
- Tony Knapp
- Jim Melrose
- Franck Moussa
- Lilian Nalis (France)
- James Pearson
- David Rennie
- James Scowcroft
- Jordan Stewart
- David Stockdale
- Martyn Waghorn
- Steve Walsh
- Gavin Ward
- Dennis Wise

=== Managed Coventry, then managed Leicester ===
- Gordon Milne

=== Played for and managed Coventry, managed Leicester ===
- Micky Adams

=== Played for Leicester, then managed Coventry ===
- Mark Robins
- Mark Venus

=== Played for and managed Leicester, played for Coventry ===
- Kevin MacDonald

== See also ==
- Leicester City F.C.–Nottingham Forest F.C. rivalry
- Derby County F.C.–Leicester City F.C. rivalry
