= Thorp Arch (training ground) =

Leeds United FC training ground

- Interactive map of Thorp Arch
- Location: Thorp Arch; Wetherby
- Coordinates: 53.917995°N 1.337521°W
- Owner: Anthony Calvert Ltd
- Type: Sports facility

Construction
- Built: c. 1994 (The Grange and training pitches); 2000 (The Barn)
- Opened: c. 1994 (The Grange and training pitches); 2002 (The Barn)
- Cost: £5 million (The Barn)

Thorp Arch is the training ground of Leeds United. Located in the village of Thorp Arch, near the town of Wetherby, the site covers 12.1 hectares. The facility consists of three sections: The Barn, The Grange and the training pitches. None of the sections are owned by Leeds United, but the Barn and the training pitches are leased to the club. Leeds' under 18s and under 16s sides play their home games on the pitches at Thorp Arch.

== History ==
Thorp Arch was the brainchild of Howard Wilkinson, who became manager of Leeds United in 1988 and realised that the club needed a modern, purpose-built training facility. At the time, the club trained on Fullerton Park, the area behind the West Stand at the club's stadium, Elland Road. In the early nineties, the club started searching nearby land where the new training ground could be built. The club settled on Thorp Arch and quickly built several pitches. A section called The Grange was also built, providing changing rooms, offices and accommodation for the academy players.

In 2000, the club vacated The Grange in order to start work on a new £5 million state-of-the-art youth academy and training facility. The move saw the academy players move in with local families. The new academy was opened in 2002 and was named The Barn. It featured a number of new facilities including an indoor pitch, a swimming pool, a gym and new changing rooms.

However, the club soon encountered financial difficulties. In July 2004, The Grange was sold to Sterling Investment Properties Limited, a company owned by David Newett, a businessman from Wetherby. As part of the deal, the club were obliged to support any planning application made by Sterling for The Grange over a period of fifty years. Six months later, The Barn and the training pitches were sold to Barnaway Limited, a company owned by Manchester-based businessman, Jacob Adler for £4.2 million, with the option of a re-purchase before 10 October 2009 for £5,828,131. Barnaway leased the facility back to the club for twenty-five years, with the club due to pay annual rent of approximately £430,000, rising 3% each year.

In September 2009, club chairman Ken Bates announced that the club were in talks with Leeds City Council regarding the council re-purchasing the facility from Adler for and leasing it back to the club. The following month, it was announced that the club and the council had agreed terms regarding the lease with the option for the club to obtain the freehold of the facility after fourteen years when all council debt has been repaid or earlier by negotiation. The deal would also see the club make Thorp Arch available for training during the 2012 Summer Olympics, the 2013 Rugby League World Cup, and the 2015 Rugby World Cup.

In the summer of 2013 new Leeds United manager Brian McDermott made a series of changes to Thorp Arch including the main training field measured to the exact length and width of the pitch at Elland Road, an extension of the sprinkler system used at Thorp Arch and a “better flow” to the grounds including mixing the first team and development squads. The physio room was also moved downstairs.

== Facilities ==
The Grange, which was only operational by the club from its opening in the early 1990s until the 2000s, accommodated the academy players, offices and changing rooms.

The site has eight full-size grass pitches and two all-weather pitches. Several of the pitches are floodlit.

The Barn, which replaced The Grange in 2002, contains a reception, a café, offices and changing rooms. It also houses:

- Indoor pitch: this is primarily used by the academy players. The pitch features artificial turf and is heated.
- Physiotherapy rooms: there are two physio rooms, one for the first team and one for the academy.
- Bio science room: this room is used for player medicals, science testing, preventative screens and academy muscular evaluations.
- Rehabilitation room: in this room, assessment work and activities such as basketball take place to help players who are recovering from an injury. The room features a sprung floor for jumping work.
- Gym: the gym is used for general player fitness as well as rehabilitation.
- Wet area: the wet area features a massage jacuzzi, a hydrotherapy pool and swimming pool which is used for rehabilitation and recuperation.
