= 1996 Football League Cup final =

- Event: 1995–96 Football League Cup
Aston Villa	Leeds United
3	0
- Date: 24 March 1996
- Venue: Wembley Stadium, London
- Man of the Match: Andy Townsend (Aston Villa)
- Referee: Robbie Hart (County Durham)
- Attendance: 77,056

The 1996 Football League Cup final took place on 24 March 1996 at Wembley Stadium and was contested between Aston Villa and Leeds United. This was the 36th final and the 30th to be played at Wembley. Aston Villa had won the trophy two years earlier, while Leeds' last victory was in their only final appearance in 1968.

In the first half the teams were separated by a goal from Savo Milošević. After half-time, Leeds United tired and Aston Villa took advantage to eventually win 3–0. Goals from Ian Taylor and Dwight Yorke completed the scoring. This was the beginning of the end for Leeds United manager Howard Wilkinson, as he was heckled by the club's fans for his and the team's failure. However, it was Villa's fifth success in the competition, at the time equalling the record set by Liverpool. This was the last time that Aston Villa won a major trophy until 30 years later when they won the UEFA Europa League in 2026.

== Road to Wembley ==
Aston Villa
Round 2 (1st leg)	Aston Villa	6–0	Peterborough United
Round 2 (2nd leg)	Peterborough United	1–1	Aston Villa
	(Aston Villa win 7–1 on aggregate)		
Round 3	Aston Villa	2–0	Stockport County
Round 4	Aston Villa	1–0	Queens Park Rangers
Quarter-final	Aston Villa	1–0	Wolverhampton Wanderers
Semi-final (1st leg)	Arsenal	2–2	Aston Villa
Semi-final (2nd leg)	Aston Villa	0–0	Arsenal
	(2–2 on aggregate. Aston Villa advance on Away Goals)		

Leeds United
Round 2 (1st leg)	Leeds United	0–0	Notts County
Round 2 (2nd leg)	Notts County	2–3	Leeds United
	(Leeds win 3–2 on aggregate)		
Round 3	Derby County	0–1	Leeds United
Round 4	Leeds United	2–1	Blackburn Rovers
Quarter-final	Leeds United	2–1	Reading
Semi-final (1st leg)	Birmingham City	1–2	Leeds United
Semi-final (2nd leg)	Leeds United	3–0	Birmingham City
	(Leeds United win 5–1 on aggregate)		

== Match details ==
24 March 1996
17:00

Aston Villa	3–0	Leeds United
Milošević 20'; Taylor 55'; Yorke 88'	Report

Wembley Stadium, London
Attendance: 77,056
Referee: Robbie Hart (County Durham)

Aston Villa	Leeds United

GK	1	(Australia) Mark Bosnich
CB	6	(England) Ugo Ehiogu
CB	5	(Republic of Ireland) Paul McGrath
CB	4	(England) Gareth Southgate
RWB	2	(England) Gary Charles
LWB	3	(England) Alan Wright
CM	7	(England) Ian Taylor
CM	11	(Republic of Ireland) Andy Townsend (c)
CM	8	(England) Mark Draper
CF	10	(Trinidad and Tobago) Dwight Yorke
CF	9	(Federal Republic of Yugoslavia) Savo Milošević
Substitutes:
GK	13	(England) Michael Oakes
DF	12	(Republic of Ireland) Steve Staunton
FW	14	(England) Tommy Johnson
Manager:
(England) Brian Little

GK	1	(England) John Lukic
CB	5	(England) John Pemberton
CB	6	(England) David Wetherall
CB	3	(South Africa) Lucas Radebe	(substituted off) 65'
RWB	2	(Republic of Ireland) Gary Kelly
LWB	11	(Wales) Gary Speed
CM	8	(England) Mark Ford	(substituted off) 46'
CM	4	(England) Carlton Palmer
CM	10	(Scotland) Gary McAllister (c)
CF	9	(Ghana) Tony Yeboah
CF	7	(Scotland) Andy Gray
Substitutes:
DF	15	(Northern Ireland) Nigel Worthington
FW	12	(England) Brian Deane	(substituted on) 46'
FW	14	(Sweden) Tomas Brolin	(substituted on) 65'
Manager:
(England) Howard Wilkinson

Man of the match

- Andy Townsend (Aston Villa)

Assistant referees
Brian Coddington
Martin Sims
Fourth official
Jim Rushton

Match rules

- 90 minutes
- 30 minutes of extra-time if necessary
- Penalty shoot-out if scores still level
- Three named substitutes, of which two may be used
