= Robbie Hart =

English football referee

- Full name: Robert Hart
- Born: 9 October 1947 (age 79); Darlington, County Durham, England

Domestic
Years	League	Role
1977–1986	Football League	Linesman
1986–1992	Football League	Referee
1992–1996	Premier League	Referee

Robert "Robbie" Hart (born 9 October 1947) is an English former football referee in the English Football League and Premier League. During his officiating career he was based in Darlington, County Durham.

== Career ==
Hart reached the Football League Linesmen's List at the age of 29 in 1977. However, he took another nine seasons to gain promotion to the Referees List. Once he had made that step up though he made swifter progress. One of his early games was between Manchester City and Huddersfield at Maine Road on 7 November 1987, when the home side won 10–1, the Yorkshire team's only goal being a penalty.

He became further established and was appointed as one of the first Premier League referees for the 1992–93 season. Over the next four seasons he handled most of his games at this level. He also took charge of key Cup games, including an FA Cup semi-final in 1995 in which Everton beat Tottenham 4–1. The following season was his last one as a top-class referee, and saw his greatest honour as he refereed the Coca-Cola Cup Final between Aston Villa and Leeds United at Wembley, with the Midlands side winning 3–0.
