= Gary McAllister =

Scottish football player and manager (born 1965)

Gary McAllister MBE
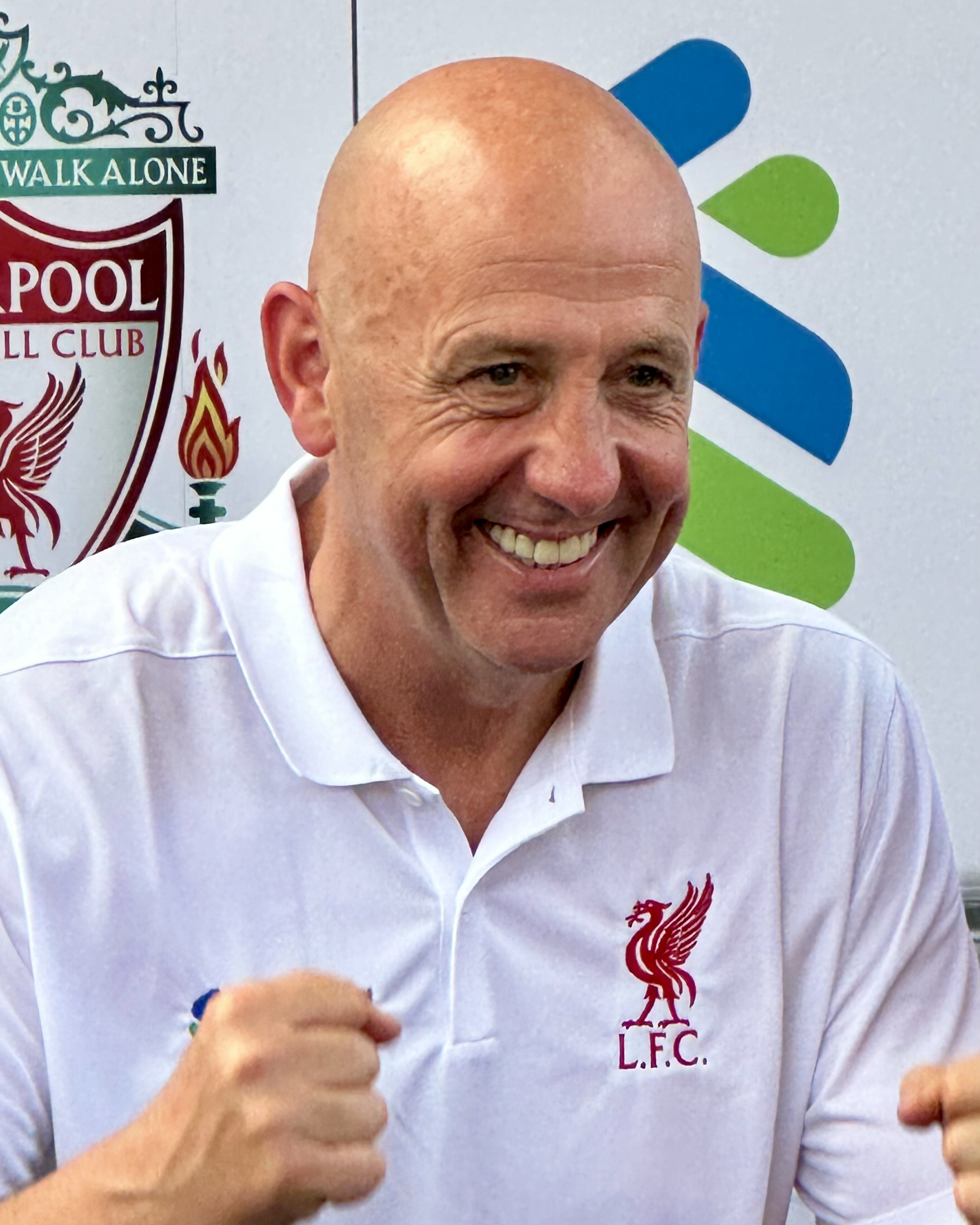
- McAllister in 2023

Personal information
- Full name: Gary McAllister
- Date of birth: 25 December 1964 (age 61)
- Place of birth: Motherwell, Scotland
- Height: 6 ft 1 in (1.85 m)
- Position: Midfielder

Senior career*
Years	Team	Apps	(Gls)
1981–1985	Motherwell	59	(6)
1985–1990	Leicester City	201	(47)
1990–1996	Leeds United	231	(31)
1996–2000	Coventry City	119	(20)
2000–2002	Liverpool	55	(5)
2002–2004	Coventry City	55	(10)
Total		720	(119)

International career
1987–1990	Scotland B	2	(1)
1989	Scotland U21	1	(0)
1990–1999	Scotland	57	(5)
1990	SFA (SFL centenary)	1	(0)

Managerial career
- 2002–2004: Coventry City (player-coach)
- 2008: Leeds United
- 2011: Aston Villa (caretaker)
- * Club domestic league appearances and goals

Gary McAllister (born 25 December 1964) is a Scottish professional football coach and former player.

McAllister played primarily as a midfielder in a career spanning over nineteen years. He started his career at local side Motherwell before moving south of the border to Leicester City at the age of 20. He then went on to play for Leeds United, where he won the English league championship in 1991–92. McAllister later had spells at Premier League sides Coventry City, where he was credited with his role in helping the club avoid relegation repeatedly, and Liverpool, where he won a cup treble in 2000–01 at the age of 36.

McAllister also represented his national side for nine years, winning 57 caps and scoring five goals. His leadership qualities were noticed, and he spent four years as Scotland captain in addition to two seasons as Leeds United captain. He was awarded an MBE in the 2001 New Year Honours in recognition of his contribution to football and was inducted to the Scottish Football Hall of Fame in 2016.

He was appointed player-manager of Coventry City in April 2002. He resigned from this position in January 2004 and did not enter management again until he returned to Elland Road in January 2008, to replace Dennis Wise as manager. McAllister guided Leeds to the promotion playoffs, but was dismissed in December 2008. In April 2011, while working as assistant to manager Gérard Houllier at Aston Villa, he became caretaker manager at the Premier League club for a few months due to Houllier's ill health. He also had coaching roles at Middlesbrough and Liverpool, returning to Scotland with Rangers in 2018. He joined Steven Gerrard in leaving Rangers making a return to Aston Villa as Assistant Manager again.

== Club career ==
=== Motherwell ===
McAllister began his playing career at his local side Motherwell; he stated he supported the club as a child, but also had an affection for Manchester United as his family were acquainted with that of Matt Busby. His senior debut was away to Queen of the South on 1 May 1982. McAllister scored eight goals in 70 appearances, culminating in a fine performance in the 1985 Scottish Cup semi-final against Celtic. With Motherwell he was more often a striker than a midfielder.

=== Leicester City ===
McAllister's performances in the cup caught the eye of Leicester City manager Gordon Milne. He signed for the English club, along with Motherwell teammate Ally Mauchlen, for a combined fee of £350,000 in August 1985. Although Mauchlen's greater experience cast McAllister as the 'make-weight' in the deal, he soon rose to prominence as an attacking force in Leicester midfield, impressing manager and fans alike with his accurate passing to feet, and confident range of skills on the ball. During his first season at Filbert Street he adapted well to regular First Division football, and began to rise to prominence in creating chances for a team that included Steve Lynex and Alan Smith.

During Leicester's ultimately unsuccessful campaign to stave off relegation to Second Division that season under Milne's successor Bryan Hamilton, McAllister found himself employed in a variety of midfield and forward roles, which affected his form. After Hamilton was replaced by David Pleat, however, his stylish playmaking abilities began to flourish.

Over the following three seasons his reputation quickly grew into being one of the best players in the Second Division, boosted by a respectable goal tally from midfield that included an uncommon number of well-executed strikes from unfavourable positions. He was named in the Second Division PFA Team of the Year in both 1988–89 and 1989–90 and was the subject of constant transfer speculation and interest by several First Division sides throughout the following term. He turned down a heavily mooted £1.15 million move to Nottingham Forest to see out his contract with Leicester after Brian Clough apparently failed to impress him during an interview.

In five seasons with Leicester, McAllister played 225 games in total, scoring 52 goals.

=== Leeds United ===
McAllister arrived at Leeds United on 2 July 1990 for a tribunal-determined fee of £1,000,000, and replaced the role vacated by Vinnie Jones when he left for Sheffield United. The club had just achieved promotion to Division One, the top tier of English football at the time. In McAllister's first season at Elland Road, Leeds finished fourth in the table and reached the League Cup semi-finals. He formed a midfield quartet that season with fellow Scottish international Gordon Strachan and relative youngsters David Batty and Gary Speed. In the 1991–92 season Leeds United were crowned League Champions.

In the rest of McAllister's time at Leeds, the highest the club finished was fifth in the 1993–94 and 1994–95 seasons. The lowest was 17th in the 1992–93 Premier League – one of the lowest-placed finishes of a defending league champion in English football history. He captained the side for two seasons. During the 1992–93 season, McAllister made his debut in the UEFA Champions League. He scored in matches against VfB Stuttgart and Rangers, but Leeds were knocked out by the latter in a match hyped as the Battle of Britain. In McAllister's final season Leeds finished 13th. He captained the team at Wembley Stadium in the 1996 League Cup Final, where they were beaten 3–0 by Aston Villa.

In his six seasons with Leeds United, McAllister played 294 games in total, scoring 45 goals.

=== Coventry City ===
Aged 31, McAllister left Leeds for Coventry City on 26 July 1996, for a fee of £3million. His move to the Midlands club came less than a year after he had scored a hat-trick against them for Leeds. He stayed there for four seasons and played firstly under Ron Atkinson and then former Leeds teammate Gordon Strachan. The side including Noel Whelan, John Salako and Darren Huckerby were in a relegation battle. Atkinson went upstairs to become 'Director of Football' in late 1996 in order to make way for Strachan. Strachan's team continued to struggle until a late season recovery. With McAllister captaining the side, the Sky Blues secured an away draw against Arsenal and wins against Chelsea, Liverpool (away) and Tottenham Hotspur (away) to secure salvation.

In Strachan's first full season as manager in 1997–98, McAllister played alongside George Boateng in midfield behind Darren Huckerby and Dion Dublin in attack finishing 11th and reaching the FA Cup quarter-finals in 1998. His final Coventry season they had a poor start including defeat by Tranmere Rovers in the League Cup and finished 15th in the league. The line-up included the likes of Robbie Keane, Mustapha Hadji, Carlton Palmer, Mo Konjić and Youssef Chippo.

During his initial time at the Sky Blues he played 140 games and scored 26 goals.

=== Liverpool ===
Aged 35, on 1 July 2000, McAllister moved to Liverpool in a Bosman transfer. Though serving for a relatively short time at Anfield, he played an integral role in the team that won a treble of cups in the 2000–01 season. Gerard Houllier described McAllister as his "most inspirational signing".

He scored a penalty winner against Barcelona in the UEFA Cup semi-final and a 44-yard free-kick that won the Merseyside derby against local rivals Everton in the fourth minute of stoppage time. He scored in the run-in against Coventry City and Bradford City. helping Liverpool to qualify for the Champions League.

Liverpool's first trophy of the season came in the League Cup final. After replacing Steven Gerrard as a 78th minute substitute, McAllister scored the team's opening penalty kick in a 5–4 shootout win over Birmingham City. He again came on as a substitute in the FA Cup final, as Liverpool came from behind to win 2–1 against Arsenal. Four days later, he was named in the starting line-up in the UEFA Cup Final against Alavés. McAllister scored one, and had a hand in three, of the five Liverpool goals in a memorable 5–4 victory. In the 117th minute, McAllister's free-kick was deflected by Alaves' Delfi Geli into his own net for the winning golden goal. He was awarded the man of the match award for his efforts, with BBC pundit and former Liverpool defender Alan Hansen stating, "Gary McAllister was outstanding. At 36, to keep going the way he did, keep taking those free-kicks and producing it when it counted, was sensational. He fully deserved his man of the match award."

McAllister began the following season by scoring a penalty in Liverpool's 2–1 win over Manchester United in the Charity Shield. He started the club's opening Champions League fixture, a 1–1 draw with Boavista at Anfield. McAllister left Anfield on 13 May 2002 to take up the role of player-manager of Coventry City. He ended his Liverpool career with a substitute appearance in a 5–0 win over Ipswich Town. At Liverpool for two years he featured 87 times and scored nine goals. McAllister was named as number 32 in the 100 Players Who Shook The Kop survey.

== International career ==
After scoring the equaliser on his debut for Scotland B against France in April 1987, McAllister debuted for Scotland in a friendly against East Germany in the buildup to the 1990 FIFA World Cup. Though he was included in the squad for the tournament, he did not make an appearance as Scotland were eliminated in the first round.

In October 1990, McAllister scored his first goal for Scotland in a UEFA Euro 1992 qualifier against Switzerland. He appeared in all three of Scotland's group stage matches at the tournament, scoring in a 3–0 win over the CIS. However, Scotland did not qualify from their group.

Scotland failed to qualify for the 1994 FIFA World Cup but did qualify for UEFA Euro 1996 in England, with McAllister the captain of the team. Scotland's second match of the group stage was against England at Wembley Stadium. In the second half Scotland, trailing 0–1 to an Alan Shearer goal, were awarded a penalty. McAllister's kick was saved by David Seaman and Scotland lost 0–2. The team won their next match against Switzerland but were eliminated on goals scored.

McAllister earned his 50th cap in a 1998 FIFA World Cup qualifier with Sweden. The team ultimately qualified for the tournament, finishing second to Austria. McAllister scored an important penalty kick in a match away to Belarus in qualifying, but he missed the finals through injury.

On 31 March 1999, McAllister returned to the Scotland team, captaining the side in a UEFA Euro 2000 qualification game against the Czech Republic. McAllister was booed by a section of Celtic Park crowd and announced his retirement from international football soon after. Despite later attempts by manager Craig Brown to convince McAllister to return, the playmaker did not add to his 57 caps.

== Coaching career ==
=== Coventry City ===
McAllister left Liverpool in May 2002 to take up the role of player-manager at Coventry City, replacing his former teammate Roland Nilsson in the job. He resigned on 12 January 2004. McAllister's former assistant, Eric Black, replaced him three days later. He selected himself in 60 matches and scored 12 goals before retiring as a player.

=== Leeds United ===
After almost four years out of the game, McAllister was appointed manager of another of his former clubs as a player, Leeds United, on 29 January 2008 with an initial contract until the end of the season. The club was sitting in sixth place after former boss Dennis Wise's surprise departure to Newcastle. McAllister's first game came four days after his appointment, a 1–0 away defeat to Southend United. Leeds lost their next game 2–0 to Tranmere Rovers and slipped to eighth. The new manager bagged his first win at the fifth attempt, in a 1–0 away victory over Swindon Town, before following it up with his first home victory against AFC Bournemouth, in which Leeds beat the relegation-threatened side 2–0.

Leeds chairman Ken Bates rewarded McAllister for his hard work and the team's good form – just two defeats in 12 games – by offering him a new 12-month rolling contract on 3 April 2008. Bates cited McAllister's general improvement of team performances and his planning for the club's future as reasons for offering him the new contract. Leeds secured a spot in the play-offs with a 1–0 at Yeovil Town on 25 April 2008, but they lost 1–0 to Doncaster Rovers in the play-off final. During his second season as manager, McAllister was sacked on 21 December 2008 after a poor string of results; these included an FA Cup defeat to part-time club Histon and culminated with a 3–1 loss to MK Dons.

=== Assistant roles ===
==== Middlesbrough ====
On 22 September 2009, it was revealed that McAllister was in talks with Scotland about replacing Steven Pressley as Scotland's third coach; however, on 25 September 2009, it was revealed that he rejected the opportunity as he was holding out for a job at club level. On 29 September 2009, it was reported that he would become Portsmouth assistant manager, but he couldn't agree a deal with the club.

On 20 May 2010, he was appointed as Middlesbrough first-team coach, where he teamed up again with Gordon Strachan. He made a return to the field to take part in Jamie Carragher's testimonial match in September of that year, appearing for Liverpool in a 4-1 win over Everton.

==== Aston Villa ====
On 18 September 2010, it was announced on the official Aston Villa website that McAllister had accepted an offer from Gérard Houllier to become the next assistant manager at Villa Park; McAllister had previously played under Houllier when the Frenchman was in charge of Liverpool. After Houllier was rushed to hospital in April 2011, McAllister was made caretaker manager for a Premier League game against Stoke City, which ended in a 1–1 draw. After he led Aston Villa to a 2–1 away win against Arsenal and a 1–0 home win over Liverpool, McAllister continued as caretaker for the remainder of the 2010–11 season. With Houllier having to step down to due ill health, it was announced on 17 June 2011 that after the appointment of Alex McLeish as manager that McAllister would not return to the club as part of the new coaching team.

==== Liverpool ====
McAllister was appointed first team coach at Liverpool in July 2015. He left the position on 8 October 2015 after the sacking of Brendan Rodgers, but was appointed to an ambassadorial position at the club.

==== Rangers ====
When Rangers announced on 4 May 2018 that Steven Gerrard would be appointed as the club's new manager, it was also confirmed that McAllister would become his assistant.

==== Return to Aston Villa ====
On 13 November 2021, shortly after Aston Villa announced that Steven Gerrard would be appointed as the club's new manager, it was also confirmed that McAllister would return to the club as Gerrard's assistant. On 26 December 2021, for the second time in his career, McAllister acted as caretaker manager for Aston Villa - this time due to Gerrard testing positive for COVID-19. He provided instructions on the touchline in a 3–1 defeat to Chelsea, with Gerrard watching the match on television at home.

On 21 October 2022, McAllister was one of several coaches who left the club, following Gerrard's sacking the day prior.

== Personal life ==
In September 2026, HM Revenue and Customs filed a bankruptcy petition against McAllister over an unpaid tax bill. A spokesman said McAllister had believed his tax adviser was in contact with HMRC about the matter and that he intended to resolve the matter imminently.

== Career statistics ==
Appearances and goals by club, season and competition
Club	Season	League			Cup (Note: Includes SFA Cup, Scottish League Cup, FA Cup, EFL Cup and FA Community Shield.)		Continental (Note: Includes UEFA Cup, UEFA Champions League and UEFA Supercup.)		Total	
Club	Season	Division	Apps	Goals	Apps	Goals	Apps	Goals	Apps	Goals
Motherwell	1981–82	First Division	1	0	?		–		1	0
Motherwell	1982–83	Premier Division	1	0	?		–		1	0
Motherwell	1983–84	Premier Division	21	0	?		–		21	0
Motherwell	1984–85	First Division	35	6	?		–		35	6
Motherwell	1985–86	Premier Division	1	0	?		–		1	0
Motherwell	Total		59	6	11	2	0	0	70	8
Leicester City	1985–86	First Division	31	7	2	1	–		33	8
Leicester City	1986–87	First Division	39	10	4	2	–		43	12
Leicester City	1987–88	Second Division	42	9	5	1	–		47	10
Leicester City	1988–89	Second Division	46	11	6	1	–		52	12
Leicester City	1989–90	Second Division	43	10	3	0	–		46	10
Leicester City	Total		201	47	20	5	0	0	221	52
Leeds United	1990–91	First Division	38	2	13	3	–		51	5
Leeds United	1991–92	First Division	42	5	5	0	–		47	5
Leeds United	1992–93	Premier League	32	5	8	3	5	2	45	10
Leeds United	1993–94	Premier League	42	8	5	0	–		47	8
Leeds United	1994–95	Premier League	41	6	6	0	–		47	6
Leeds United	1995–96	Premier League	36	5	14	4	4	1	54	10
Leeds United	Total		231	31	51	10	9	3	291	44
Coventry City	1996–97	Premier League	38	6	8	1	–		46	7
Coventry City	1997–98	Premier League	14	0	4	2	–		18	2
Coventry City	1998–99	Premier League	29	3	4	1	–		33	4
Coventry City	1999–00	Premier League	38	11	5	2	–		43	13
Coventry City	Total		119	20	21	6	0	0	140	26
Liverpool	2000–01	Premier League	30	5	10	0	9	2	49	7
Liverpool	2001–02	Premier League	25	0	2	2	11	0	38	2
Liverpool	Total		55	5	12	2	20	2	87	9
Coventry	2002–03	1st Division	41	7	5	2	–		46	9
Coventry	2003–04	1st Division	14	3	0	0	–		14	3
Coventry	Total		55	10	5	2	0	0	60	12
Career total			720	119	120	27	29	5	868	154

Appearances and goals by national team and year
National team	Year	Apps	Goals
Scotland	1990	6	1
Scotland	1991	4	0
Scotland	1992	11	3
Scotland	1993	4	0
Scotland	1994	6	0
Scotland	1995	6	0
Scotland	1996	9	0
Scotland	1997	10	1
Scotland	1998	0	0
Scotland	1999	1	0
Total		57	5

Scores and results list Scotland's goal tally first, score column indicates score after each McAllister goal.

List of international goals scored by Gary McAllister
No.	Date	Venue	Opponent	Score	Result	Competition
1	17 October 1990	Hampden Park, Glasgow, Scotland	Switzerland		2–1	UEFA Euro 1992 qualifying
2	20 May 1992	Varsity Stadium, Toronto, Canada	Canada		3–1	Friendly
3	20 May 1992	Varsity Stadium, Toronto, Canada	Canada		3–1	Friendly
4	18 June 1992	Idrottsparken, Norrköping, Sweden	CIS		3–0	UEFA Euro 1992
5	8 June 1997	Dinamo Stadium, Minsk, Belarus	Belarus		1–0	1998 World Cup qualification

== Honours ==
=== Player ===
Motherwell

- Scottish First Division: 1984–85

Leeds United

- Football League First Division: 1991–92
- FA Charity Shield: 1992
- Football League Cup runner-up: 1995–96

Liverpool

- FA Cup: 2000–01
- Football League Cup: 2000–01
- FA Charity Shield: 2001
- UEFA Cup: 2000–01
- UEFA Super Cup: 2001

Individual

- PFA Team of the Year: 1988–89 Second Division, 1989–90 Second Division, 1991–92 First Division, 1993–94 Premier League
- Premier League Player of the Month: April 2001
- Scottish FA International Roll of Honour — 57 caps
- Coventry City Player of the Year: 1999–2000
- Scottish Football Hall of Fame Inductee 2016

== See also ==
- List of footballers in England by number of league appearances (500+)
- List of Scotland national football team captains
