= 1995–96 Football League Cup =

League Cup, Coca-Cola Cup

Tournament details
- Country: England; Wales
- Teams: 92

Final positions
- Champions: Aston Villa (5th title)
- Runners-up: Leeds United

Tournament statistics
- Top goal scorer(s): Ian Wright (7 goals)

The 1995–96 Football League Cup (known as the Coca-Cola Cup for sponsorship reasons) was the 36th Football League Cup, a knockout competition for England's top 92 football clubs.

The tournament was won by Aston Villa, who beat Leeds United 3–0 in the final at Wembley Stadium.

== First round ==
56 of the First, Second and Third Division clubs compete from the First Round. Each section is divided equally into a pot of seeded clubs and a pot of unseeded clubs. Clubs' rankings depend upon their finishing position in the 1994–95 season.

=== First leg ===
| Home team | Score | Away team | Date |
|---|---|---|---|
| Barnet | 0–0 | Charlton Athletic | 15 August 1995 |
| Birmingham City | 1–0 | Plymouth Argyle | 15 August 1995 |
| Bradford City | 2–1 | Blackpool | 15 August 1995 |
| Cambridge United | 2–1 | Swindon Town | 15 August 1995 |
| Chester City | 4–1 | Wigan Athletic | 15 August 1995 |
| Chesterfield | 0–1 | Bury | 15 August 1995 |
| Colchester United | 2–1 | Bristol City | 15 August 1995 |
| Crewe Alexandra | 4–0 | Darlington | 23 August 1995 |
| Doncaster Rovers | 1–1 | Shrewsbury Town | 14 August 1995 |
| Fulham | 3–0 | Brighton & Hove Albion | 15 August 1995 |
| Gillingham | 1–1 | Bristol Rovers | 15 August 1995 |
| Hereford United | 0–2 | Oxford United | 15 August 1995 |
| Huddersfield Town | 1–2 | Port Vale | 15 August 1995 |
| Hull City | 1–2 | Carlisle United | 15 August 1995 |
| Luton Town | 1–1 | Bournemouth | 15 August 1995 |
| Mansfield Town | 0–1 | Burnley | 15 August 1995 |
| Notts County | 2–0 | Lincoln City | 15 August 1995 |
| Portsmouth | 0–2 | Cardiff City | 16 August 1995 |
| Preston North End | 1–1 | Sunderland | 15 August 1995 |
| Rochdale | 2–1 | York City | 15 August 1995 |
| Scarborough | 1–0 | Hartlepool United | 15 August 1995 |
| Scunthorpe United | 4–1 | Rotherham United | 15 August 1995 |
| Stockport County | 1–0 | Wrexham | 15 August 1995 |
| Swansea City | 4–1 | Peterborough United | 15 August 1995 |
| Torquay United | 0–0 | Exeter City | 15 August 1995 |
| Walsall | 2–2 | Brentford | 15 August 1995 |
| West Bromwich Albion | 1–1 | Northampton Town | 15 August 1995 |
| Wycombe Wanderers | 3–0 | Leyton Orient | 15 August 1995 |

=== Second leg ===
| Home team | Score | Away team | Date | Agg |
|---|---|---|---|---|
| Blackpool | 2–3 | Bradford City | 22 August 1995 | 3–5 |
| Bournemouth | 2–1 | Luton Town | 22 August 1995 | 3–2 |
| Brentford | 3–2 | Walsall | 22 August 1995 | 5–4 |
| Brighton & Hove Albion | 0–2 | Fulham | 22 August 1995 | 0–5 |
| Bristol City | 2–1 | Colchester United | 22 August 1995 | 3–3 |
| Bristol Rovers | 4–2 | Gillingham | 23 August 1995 | 5–3 |
| Burnley | 3–1 | Mansfield Town | 22 August 1995 | 4–1 |
| Bury | 2–1 | Chesterfield | 5 September 1995 | 3–1 |
| Cardiff City | 1–0 | Portsmouth | 22 August 1995 | 3–0 |
| Carlisle United | 2–4 | Hull City | 22 August 1995 | 4–5 |
| Charlton Athletic | 2–0 | Barnet | 22 August 1995 | 2–0 |
| Darlington | 1–1 | Crewe Alexandra | 5 September 1995 | 1–5 |
| Exeter City | 1–1 | Torquay United | 23 August 1995 | 1–1 |
| Hartlepool United | 1–0 | Scarborough | 22 August 1995 | 1–1 |
| Leyton Orient | 2–0 | Wycombe Wanderers | 22 August 1995 | 2–3 |
| Lincoln City | 0–2 | Notts County | 22 August 1995 | 0–4 |
| Northampton Town | 2–4 | West Bromwich Albion | 22 August 1995 | 3–5 |
| Oxford United | 3–2 | Hereford United | 22 August 1995 | 5–2 |
| Peterborough United | 3–0 | Swansea City | 22 August 1995 | 4–4 |
| Plymouth Argyle | 1–2 | Birmingham City | 22 August 1995 | 1–3 |
| Port Vale | 1–3 | Huddersfield Town | 22 August 1995 | 3–4 |
| Rotherham United | 5–0 | Scunthorpe United | 22 August 1995 | 6–4 |
| Shrewsbury Town | 0–0 | Doncaster Rovers | 22 August 1995 | 1–1 |
| Sunderland | 3–2 | Preston North End | 23 August 1995 | 4–3 |
| Swindon Town | 2–0 | Cambridge United | 23 August 1995 | 3–2 |
| Wigan Athletic | 1–3 | Chester City | 22 August 1995 | 2–7 |
| Wrexham | 2–2 | Stockport County | 5 September 1995 | 2–3 |
| York City | 5–1 | Rochdale | 22 August 1995 | 6–3 |

== Second round ==
=== First leg ===
| Home team | Score | Away team | Date |
|---|---|---|---|
| Aston Villa | 6–0 | Peterborough United | 20 September 1995 |
| Birmingham City | 3–1 | Grimsby Town | 20 September 1995 |
| Bolton Wanderers | 1–0 | Brentford | 19 September 1995 |
| Bradford City | 3–2 | Nottingham Forest | 19 September 1995 |
| Bristol City | 0–5 | Newcastle United | 19 September 1995 |
| Bristol Rovers | 0–1 | West Ham United | 20 September 1995 |
| Cardiff City | 0–3 | Southampton | 19 September 1995 |
| Coventry City | 2–0 | Hull City | 20 September 1995 |
| Crewe Alexandra | 2–2 | Sheffield Wednesday | 19 September 1995 |
| Hartlepool United | 0–3 | Arsenal | 19 September 1995 |
| Huddersfield Town | 2–0 | Barnsley | 19 September 1995 |
| Leeds United | 0–0 | Notts County | 19 September 1995 |
| Leicester City | 2–0 | Burnley | 20 September 1995 |
| Liverpool | 2–0 | Sunderland | 20 September 1995 |
| Manchester United | 0–3 | York City | 20 September 1995 |
| Middlesbrough | 2–1 | Rotherham United | 20 September 1995 |
| Millwall | 0–0 | Everton | 20 September 1995 |
| Norwich City | 6–1 | Torquay United | 20 September 1995 |
| Oxford United | 1–1 | Queens Park Rangers | 19 September 1995 |
| Reading | 1–1 | West Bromwich Albion | 20 September 1995 |
| Sheffield United | 2–1 | Bury | 20 September 1995 |
| Shrewsbury Town | 1–3 | Derby County | 19 September 1995 |
| Southend United | 2–2 | Crystal Palace | 19 September 1995 |
| Stockport County | 1–1 | Ipswich Town | 19 September 1995 |
| Stoke City | 0–0 | Chelsea | 20 September 1995 |
| Swindon Town | 2–3 | Blackburn Rovers | 20 September 1995 |
| Tottenham Hotspur | 4–0 | Chester City | 20 September 1995 |
| Tranmere Rovers | 1–0 | Oldham Athletic | 19 September 1995 |
| Watford | 1–1 | Bournemouth | 19 September 1995 |
| Wimbledon | 4–5 | Charlton Athletic | 19 September 1995 |
| Wolverhampton Wanderers | 2–0 | Fulham | 20 September 1995 |
| Wycombe Wanderers | 0–0 | Manchester City | 19 September 1995 |

=== Second leg ===
| Home team | Score | Away team | Date | Agg |
|---|---|---|---|---|
| Arsenal | 5–0 | Hartlepool United | 3 October 1995 | 8–0 |
| Barnsley | 4–0 | Huddersfield Town | 3 October 1995 | 4–2 |
| Blackburn Rovers | 2–0 | Swindon Town | 4 October 1995 | 5–2 |
| Bournemouth | 1–1 | Watford | 3 October 1995 | 2–2 |
| Brentford | 2–3 | Bolton Wanderers | 3 October 1995 | 2–4 |
| Burnley | 0–2 | Leicester City | 3 October 1995 | 0–4 |
| Bury | 4–2 | Sheffield United | 3 October 1995 | 5–4 |
| Charlton Athletic | 3–3 | Wimbledon | 3 October 1995 | 8–7 |
| Chelsea | 0–1 | Stoke City | 4 October 1995 | 0–1 |
| Chester City | 1–3 | Tottenham Hotspur | 4 October 1995 | 1–7 |
| Crystal Palace | 2–0 | Southend United | 3 October 1995 | 4–2 |
| Derby County | 1–1 | Shrewsbury Town | 4 October 1995 | 4–2 |
| Everton | 2–4 | Millwall | 4 October 1995 | 2–4 |
| Fulham | 1–5 | Wolverhampton Wanderers | 3 October 1995 | 1–7 |
| Grimsby Town | 1–1 | Birmingham City | 3 October 1995 | 2–4 |
| Hull City | 0–1 | Coventry City | 4 October 1995 | 0–3 |
| Ipswich Town | 1–2 | Stockport County | 3 October 1995 | 2–3 |
| Manchester City | 4–0 | Wycombe Wanderers | 4 October 1995 | 4–0 |
| Newcastle United | 3–1 | Bristol City | 4 October 1995 | 8–1 |
| Nottingham Forest | 2–2 | Bradford City | 4 October 1995 | 4–5 |
| Notts County | 2–3 | Leeds United | 3 October 1995 | 2–3 |
| Oldham Athletic | 1–3 | Tranmere Rovers | 4 October 1995 | 1–4 |
| Peterborough United | 1–1 | Aston Villa | 3 October 1995 | 1–7 |
| Queens Park Rangers | 2–1 | Oxford United | 3 October 1995 | 3–2 |
| Rotherham United | 0–1 | Middlesbrough | 3 October 1995 | 1–3 |
| Sheffield Wednesday | 5–2 | Crewe Alexandra | 4 October 1995 | 7–4 |
| Southampton | 2–1 | Cardiff City | 4 October 1995 | 5–1 |
| Sunderland | 0–1 | Liverpool | 4 October 1995 | 0–3 |
| Torquay United | 2–3 | Norwich City | 4 October 1995 | 3–9 |
| West Bromwich Albion | 2–4 | Reading | 3 October 1995 | 3–5 |
| West Ham United | 3–0 | Bristol Rovers | 4 October 1995 | 4–0 |
| York City | 1–3 | Manchester United | 3 October 1995 | 4–3 |

== Third round ==
Most matches in the third round were played on 24 and 25 October with 1 match being played on 7 November.

=== Ties ===
| Home team | Score | Away team | Date |
|---|---|---|---|
| Aston Villa | 2–0 | Stockport County | 25 October 1995 |
| Barnsley | 0–3 | Arsenal | 24 October 1995 |
| Birmingham City | 1–1 | Tranmere Rovers | 24 October 1995 |
| Bolton Wanderers | 0–0 | Leicester City | 24 October 1995 |
| Crystal Palace | 2–2 | Middlesbrough | 25 October 1995 |
| Coventry City | 3–2 | Tottenham Hotspur | 25 October 1995 |
| Derby County | 0–1 | Leeds United | 25 October 1995 |
| Liverpool | 4–0 | Manchester City | 25 October 1995 |
| Millwall | 0–2 | Sheffield Wednesday | 25 October 1995 |
| Norwich City | 0–0 | Bradford City | 25 October 1995 |
| Queens Park Rangers | 3–1 | York City | 25 October 1995 |
| Reading | 2–1 | Bury | 7 November 1995 |
| Southampton | 2–1 | West Ham United | 25 October 1995 |
| Stoke City | 0–4 | Newcastle United | 25 October 1995 |
| Watford | 1–2 | Blackburn Rovers | 24 October 1995 |
| Wolverhampton Wanderers | 0–0 | Charlton Athletic | 25 October 1995 |

=== Replays ===
| Home team | Score | Away team | Date |
|---|---|---|---|
| Tranmere Rovers | 1–3 | Birmingham City | 8 November 1995 |
| Leicester City | 2–3 | Bolton Wanderers | 8 November 1995 |
| Middlesbrough | 2–0 | Crystal Palace | 8 November 1995 |
| Bradford City | 3–5 | Norwich City | 8 November 1995 |
| Charlton Athletic | 1–2 | Wolverhampton Wanderers | 8 November 1995 |

== Fourth round ==
Most matches were played on 28–29 November with two replays being played on 20 December.

=== Ties ===
| Home team | Score | Away team | Date |
|---|---|---|---|
| Arsenal | 2–1 | Sheffield Wednesday | 29 November 1995 |
| Aston Villa | 1–0 | Queens Park Rangers | 29 November 1995 |
| Leeds United | 2–1 | Blackburn Rovers | 29 November 1995 |
| Liverpool | 0–1 | Newcastle United | 29 November 1995 |
| Middlesbrough | 0–0 | Birmingham City | 29 November 1995 |
| Norwich City | 0–0 | Bolton Wanderers | 29 November 1995 |
| Reading | 2–1 | Southampton | 28 November 1995 |
| Wolverhampton Wanderers | 2–1 | Coventry City | 29 November 1995 |

=== Replays ===
| Home team | Score | Away team | Date |
|---|---|---|---|
| Birmingham City | 2–0 | Middlesbrough | 20 December 1995 |
| Bolton Wanderers | 0–0 | Norwich City | 20 December 1995 |

== Quarter-finals ==
The four matches were played between 10 January with one replay being played on 24 January.

=== Ties ===
| Home team | Score | Away team | Date |
|---|---|---|---|
| Arsenal | 2–0 | Newcastle United | 10 January 1996 |
| Aston Villa | 1–0 | Wolverhampton Wanderers | 10 January 1996 |
| Leeds United | 2–1 | Reading | 10 January 1996 |
| Norwich City | 1–1 | Birmingham City | 10 January 1996 |

=== Replay ===
| Home team | Score | Away team | Date |
|---|---|---|---|
| Birmingham City | 2–1 | Norwich City | 24 January 1996 |

== Semi-finals ==
The semi-final draw was made in January 1996 after the conclusion of the quarter finals. Unlike the other rounds, the semi-final ties were played over two legs, with each team playing one leg at home. The first leg matches were played on 11 and 14 February 1996, the second leg matches were played on 21 and 25 February 1996. Leeds United comfortably beat Birmingham City to reach their first domestic cup final for 23 years, while four-time winners Aston Villa only overcame Arsenal on away goals.

=== First leg ===
11 February 1996

| Birmingham City | 1–2 | Leeds United |
|---|---|---|
| Francis 27' | | Yeboah 53'; Whyte 72' (o.g.) |

St Andrew's, Birmingham
Attendance: 24,781
14 February 1996

| Arsenal | 2–2 | Aston Villa |
|---|---|---|
| Bergkamp 26', 32' | | Yorke 38', 72' |

Highbury, London
Attendance: 37,562

=== Second leg ===
21 February 1996

| Aston Villa | 0–0 | Arsenal |

Villa Park, Birmingham
Attendance: 39,334

Aston Villa win on away goals

25 February 1996

| Leeds United | 3–0 | Birmingham City |
|---|---|---|
| Masinga 54'; Yeboah 56'; Deane 86' |

Elland Road, Leeds
Attendance: 35,435

Leeds United win 5–1 on aggregate

== Final ==
The 1996 Coca-Cola Cup Final was played on 24 March 1996 and was contested between Aston Villa and Leeds United at Wembley Stadium. Aston Villa won the final 3–0 to equal Liverpool's record of five League Cup titles.

24 March 1996
17:00

| Aston Villa | 3–0 | Leeds United |
|---|---|---|
| Milošević 20'; Taylor 55'; Yorke 89' | Report |

Wembley Stadium, London
Attendance: 77,065
Referee: Robbie Hart (County Durham)
