= Noel Whelan =

English former footballer & broadcaster

Personal information
- Full name: Noel David Whelan
- Date of birth: 30 December 1974 (age 51)
- Place of birth: Leeds, England
- Height: 6 ft 2 in (1.88 m)
- Positions: Striker; winger

Youth career
- Leeds United

Senior career*
Years	Team	Apps	(Gls)
1993–1995	Leeds United	48	(7)
1995–2000	Coventry City	133	(31)
2000–2003	Middlesbrough	61	(5)
2003	→ Crystal Palace (loan)	8	(3)
2003	Millwall	15	(4)
2004	Derby County	8	(0)
2004–2005	Aberdeen	20	(5)
2005–2006	Boston United	15	(4)
2006	Livingston	8	(1)
2006–2007	Dunfermline Athletic	1	(0)
2008–2009	Harrogate Town	0	(0)
2009–2010	Darlington	2	(0)
Total		319	(60)

International career
1994	England U21	2	(1)
- * Club domestic league appearances and goals

Noel David Whelan (/ˈhwiːlən/; born 30 December 1974) is an English football coach, former professional footballer and radio co-commentator.

As a player, he was a striker who notably played in the Premier League for Leeds United, Coventry City, and Middlesbrough. He also played in the Scottish Premier League with Aberdeen, Livingston, and Dunfermline Athletic, and in the Football League for Crystal Palace, Millwall, Derby County, Boston United, and Darlington. He also had spell in Non-league football with Harrogate Town and was capped twice by England U21, scoring once.

He now works as a matchday co-commentator for all Leeds United games on BBC Radio Leeds. He was also a former academy coach for Derby County.

== Playing career ==
=== Leeds United ===
Born in Leeds, Whelan started off with his professional career at home town team Leeds United. Whelan revealed he had held out for Leeds to sign him (the club he supports) after having trials at Arsenal, Manchester United, and Everton, coming through the Leeds youth team with a number of other talented youngsters who beat a Manchester United team boasting David Beckham, Paul Scholes, Nicky Butt, Keith Gillespie, Phil Neville and Gary Neville both home and away in the FA Youth Cup Final. Turning professional in March 1993, he made his debut in the first season of the FA Premier League, in a 1–1 draw at Sheffield Wednesday on 4 May 1993. The following season, he made 16 league appearances but failed to score.

He had a promising 1994–95 season, finishing among the club's highest scorers where he scored seven goals in 23 league games, but lost his place to new signing Tony Yeboah halfway through the season. During his time at Leeds, he was capped twice by the England U-21 side in 1994, scoring once.

=== Coventry City ===
On 16 December 1995, after making eight goalless appearances in the league 1995–96 season, Whelan was signed by Coventry City manager Ron Atkinson for £2million. Atkinson's assistant Gordon Strachan, who had joined Coventry from Leeds the previous season, played a big role in securing the signing. Whelan made his debut in midfield in a 4–1 local derby defeat against Aston Villa at Villa Park. In his second game, against Everton at Coventry's Highfield Road stadium, Whelan played as a striker alongside Dion Dublin, and scored the winning goal with a cool finish, which would become his trademark for the rest of the season. Further goals came in the away win at Burnden Park against Bolton Wanderers, and in the New Year's Day home draw with Southampton. The latter was a "Goal of the Month" contender on the BBC's Match of the Day. It saw Whelan dribble the ball from just inside the Southampton half, and beat several players before shooting past the keeper. By the end of that season, he had managed eight goals from 21 league games for the Sky Blues, who secured Premier League safety by finishing 16th.

Whelan played regularly for the Sky Blues throughout the 1996–97 season without providing the spark of the previous season, as the club again struggled to avoid relegation, with Ron Atkinson becoming director of football and Gordon Strachan being promoted to the manager's seat in November. His reputation as the bright young thing was usurped by his new strike partner Darren Huckerby. Whelan still managed six goals from 35 league games that season.

The Sky Blues' form improved markedly in the 1997–98 season as they rose to mid-table respectability in the Premiership under manager Gordon Strachan, with Noel Whelan playing a key role in midfield. With Dublin and Huckerby scoring regularly upfront, Whelan played in a wide left midfield role, scoring the opener in a notable home win over Manchester United, and the home draw with Arsenal.

Whelan started the 1998–99 season in midfield, but moved back upfront following the departure of Dion Dublin to Aston Villa. Back in an attacking position, Whelan struck up a good partnership with Darren Huckerby, bringing his best goal return (10 in 31 Premier League games) in the process, and prompting some Coventry City fans to demand his inclusion in the England national team squad. Coventry fans were expecting a great deal of the Whelan-Huckerby partnership in the 1999–2000 season but were to be disappointed as first Whelan sustained a bad injury in pre-season and Huckerby was sold to Leeds United. Whelan would miss most of the first half of the season as Gordon Strachan built an exciting new team featuring Robbie Keane, and the Moroccan duo Moustapha Hadji and Youssef Chippo. Whelan did manage to get back into the team near the end of the season but it was clear he was no longer first choice, with Keane and Cedric Roussel establishing themselves as first choice strikers. Whelan made a total of 124 league appearances for Coventry in nearly five years there, scoring 31 goals.

=== Middlesbrough ===
On 4 August 2000, Whelan was sold to Bryan Robson's Middlesbrough for £2.2million. His debut was at Highfield Road as a substitute in Boro's 3–1 victory on the opening day of the 2000–01 season. The three-year spell with Boro would be the last time Whelan would feature prominently for a club for more than one season. He did, however, enjoy a brilliant run of form, possibly the best of his career, which includes a goal against Manchester United in the FA Cup fourth round in Middlesbrough's 2–0 victory, after which he celebrated by simply giving the "Leeds Salute", because of his love of the West Yorkshire club and their bitter rivalry with his opponents that day. He also scored an own goal against his former club Coventry on his 26th birthday. The match ended up in a 1–1 draw. He had limited chances in the league, though, appearing in just 19 out of Middlesbrough's 38 Premier League matches in the 2001–02 season, scoring four times. He would appear 15 times for Middlesbrough in the 2002–03 league campaign, scoring once.

=== Later career ===
Following a short loan spell with Crystal Palace, where he netted three times in eight appearances, Whelan left Middlesbrough to join Millwall, managing four goals in fifteen appearances. Whelan left Millwall and signed for his fourth club that season, joining Derby County.

The goalless spell at Derby saw Whelan sign for Scottish club Aberdeen at the start of the 2004–05 season and he would score five times in twenty appearances for the Pittodrie side. His one-year contract passed without renewal and Whelan moved back to England to start the 2005–06 season at Football League Two club Boston United, where he scored four goals in fifteen games. Following his admission to the Sporting Chance alcoholism treatment clinic in early January 2006, Whelan left Boston and spend the last two months of the season in the Scottish Premier League with Livingston, where he couldn't prevent the side from being relegated into the Scottish First Division. He scored once during his spell at Livingston in a 2–1 defeat at Motherwell.

Whelan stayed in the Scottish Premier League, as he signed a one-year contract with Dunfermline Athletic in July 2006, making his first competitive start on 29 July against Heart of Midlothian in a 2–1 defeat. Unfortunately, he had to leave the field injured after just three minutes. After six months out injured Dunfermline terminated their contract with Whelan by mutual consent on 4 January 2007. The following day's papers linked him with a move to First Division leaders Gretna to spearhead them in their charge for Scottish Premier League football. Since then Whelan has assisted in coaching at Dunfermline, whilst studying for coaching badges; he is said to be interested in a career in management.

He joined Conference North side Harrogate Town on 11 December 2008.

In October 2009, Whelan joined League Two's bottom-placed side Darlington on non-contract basis, to become new manager Steve Staunton's first signing. He made his debut for Darlington against third-placed Dagenham & Redbridge on 10 October but he was substituted by Curtis Main before half-time because of a muscle strain injury, in a game which Darlington lost 2–0. He did not play again for Darlington until 26 January, more than three months after his debut, when he came on as a second-half substitute against Northampton Town. However, his comeback lasted only two minutes, before he himself was substituted because of a hamstring injury.

== Coaching career ==
Whelan holds a UEFA B coaching Licence. Whelan first started his coaching career as a player coach at Dunfermline Athletic. After his playing career came to an end Whelan worked as a youth team coach at one of his former clubs Derby County, but after more than 12 months as a coach at Derby, Whelan decided that his commute from Harrogate was too much of a strain. Since leaving his role at Derby Whelan has been involved in the hospitality circuit at another of his former clubs Coventry City.

On 17 November 2010, Whelan revealed he has put his name forward for a role working within Leeds United's academy. Leeds are the club who Whelan supports and also who gave him the chance to become a professional footballer.

After playing and captaining Leeds United in the Yorkshire Masters Tournament, which Leeds won. Whelan revealed he was going to help coach at Derby County's academy after turning down a coaching role at Nottingham Forest.

In April 2019, Whelan joined EFL Championship side Leeds United as a coach for Leeds United Development Hub for elite player development scholarship.

== Radio and TV career ==
Whelan competed in an episode of Celebrity MasterChef broadcast in 2008, but was eliminated in the first round.

From the 2013–14 football season, he became the co-commentator alongside Commentator Adam Pope and Katherine Hannah for BBC Radio Leeds coverage of all Leeds United games, with Whelan becoming synonymous for a catchphrase of 'Get in' every time Leeds scored.

During the 2017–18 season, Whelan as well as working for BBC, Whelan also sporadically featured on Sky Sports News as an in-studio summariser for football matches.

On 31 January 2018, Whelan also featured in a two part documentary exclusive to Leeds United's TV channel LUTV called 'I Wore The Shirt'.

== Personal life ==
Whelan is a father of two sons and three daughters. He is also an uncle to two boys.

== Honours ==
=== As a player ===
Leeds United

- FA Youth Cup: 1992–93

Boston United

- Lincolnshire Senior Cup: 2005–06

Dunfermline Athletic

- Scottish Cup runner-up: 2006–07
