= 1994–95 FA Premier League =

Football season in England

Premier League
- Season: 1994–95
- Dates: 20 August 1994 – 14 May 1995
- Champions: Blackburn Rovers; 1st Premier League title 3rd English title
- Relegated: Crystal Palace; Norwich City; Leicester City; Ipswich Town
- Champions League: Blackburn Rovers
- Cup Winners' Cup: Everton
- UEFA Cup: Manchester United; Nottingham Forest; Liverpool; Leeds United (through UEFA Respect Fair Play ranking)
- Intertoto Cup: Tottenham Hotspur; Wimbledon; Sheffield Wednesday
- Matches: 462
- Goals: 1,195 (2.59 per match)
- Top goalscorer: Alan Shearer (34 goals)
- Best goalkeeper: Peter Schmeichel (20 clean sheets)
- Biggest home win: Manchester United 9–0 Ipswich Town (4 March 1995)
- Biggest away win: Sheffield Wednesday 1–7 Nottingham Forest (1 April 1995)
- Highest scoring: Manchester United 9–0 Ipswich Town (4 March 1995)
- Longest winning run: 7 games Blackburn Rovers
- Longest unbeaten run: 13 games Nottingham Forest
- Longest winless run: 12 games Everton; Southampton
- Longest losing run: 8 games Ipswich Town
- Highest attendance: 43,868; Manchester United 1–0 Sheffield Wednesday (7 May 1995)
- Lowest attendance: 5,268; Wimbledon 2–0 Manchester City (21 March 1995)
- Total attendance: 11,203,236
- Average attendance: 24,249

The 1994–95 FA Premier League (known as the FA Carling Premiership for sponsorship reasons) was the third season of the competition, since its formation in 1992 as the top division of professional football in England. Due to the decision to reduce the number of clubs in the FA Premier League from 22 to 20 starting from the following season, four clubs were to be relegated.

== Overview ==
=== Transfers ===
Just before the start of the season, the English transfer record was broken when Blackburn Rovers paid £5 million for 21-year-old Norwich City striker Chris Sutton. But that record was broken again in January when Manchester United paid £6 million for Newcastle United's Andy Cole, in a deal which also saw £1 million-rated Keith Gillespie move to Newcastle. Other significant transfers before and during the 1994–95 season included: Vinny Samways (Tottenham to Everton, £2 million), David Rocastle (Manchester City to Chelsea, £1.25 million), Jürgen Klinsmann (Monaco to Tottenham Hotspur, £2 million), John Scales (Wimbledon to Liverpool, £3 million) and Paul Kitson (Derby County to Newcastle United, £2.2 million).

=== Summary ===
The title was won by Blackburn Rovers, whose last title success was in 1914, and also was Blackburn's first major trophy in 67 years (the last being 1927–28 FA Cup). Kenny Dalglish's side secured the championship on the last day of the season despite losing 2–1 at his former club Liverpool, as Manchester United could only manage a 1–1 draw at West Ham. This meant that Blackburn Rovers qualified for the European Cup for the first time in their history, while Manchester United finished second earning a UEFA Cup place. A single point separated the two sides, who for more than half of the season enjoyed a wide gap in terms of point between themselves and the rest of the league, despite the likes of Nottingham Forest, Liverpool and Newcastle United looking like title contenders during the first three months of the season.

Also qualifying for the UEFA Cup were Nottingham Forest (who finished third in their first season back in the Premier League), Liverpool (who finished fourth and won their fifth League Cup in the club's first full season following the appointment of Roy Evans). Fifth-placed Leeds United also secured a place via the newly-introduced UEFA Fair Play ranking, by virtue of the Premier League's exemplary disciplinary record through the season.

The number of teams in the league for the following year would be reduced to 20. This was to be achieved by increasing the number of teams facing relegation to four, and reducing the number of teams being promoted from Division 1 to two. Ipswich Town were relegated in bottom place after winning just seven league games and conceding 93 goals. Newly promoted Leicester City also went down, winning just six times in the league and never being outside the bottom two after November. Norwich City, who had been in contention for a UEFA Cup place halfway through the season, suffered a nosedive in form during the second half of the season and were relegated just two seasons after being title contenders. The final relegation place on the last day of the season went to Crystal Palace, who still lost 3–2 despite a strong fightback at Newcastle after being 3–0 down.

=== Controversial incidents ===
In January 1995, Manchester United's 28-year-old French striker Eric Cantona (then holder of the PFA Players' Player of the Year award) assaulted a Crystal Palace fan who verbally abused him in his team's 1–1 draw at Selhurst Park. Cantona was banned from football for eight months, fined £20,000 and sentenced to 14 days in prison. The prison sentence was later reduced to 120 hours community service on appeal.

Chelsea midfielder Dennis Wise was convicted of criminal damage and assault, relating to a fight with a taxi driver in London. He was given a three-month prison sentence but the conviction and prison sentence were quickly overturned on appeal.

Arsenal midfielder Paul Merson admitted in November 1994 that he was an alcoholic and was also addicted to cocaine and gambling. He underwent a three-month drug rehabilitation programme before being allowed to resume his playing career.

Crystal Palace striker Chris Armstrong failed a drugs test in February 1995 but admitted that he had done wrong and returned to action after just four weeks undergoing rehabilitation. Armstrong was Palace's leading goalscorer in 1994–95, helping them reach the semi-finals of both domestic cup competitions, but was unable to prevent them from being relegated back to the First Division just one season after winning promotion.

Arsenal manager George Graham was sacked in February 1995 after nearly nine years in charge, when it was revealed that he had accepted an illegal payment of £425,000 from Norwegian agent Rune Hauge relating to the purchases of Norwegian and Danish players Pål Lydersen and John Jensen three years earlier. Graham was later banned from football for one year by the FA.

== Teams ==
Twenty-two teams competed in the league – the top nineteen teams from the previous season and the three teams promoted from the First Division. The promoted teams were Crystal Palace, Nottingham Forest (both teams returning to the top flight after a season's absence), and Leicester City (returning after a top flight absence of seven years). This was also Leicester City's first season in the Premier League. They replaced Sheffield United, Oldham Athletic and Swindon Town, who were relegated to the First Division after their top flight spells of four, three and one year respectively. This was the final season to be contested by twenty-two teams as all seasons after have been contested by twenty teams.

=== Stadiums and locations ===
Locations of the 1994–95 Premier League teams
Greater London Premier League football clubs

Team	Location	Stadium	Capacity
Arsenal	London (Highbury)	Highbury	38,419
Aston Villa	Birmingham	Villa Park	39,399
Blackburn Rovers	Blackburn	Ewood Park	31,367
Chelsea	London (Fulham)	Stamford Bridge	36,000
Coventry City	Coventry	Highfield Road	23,489
Crystal Palace	London (Selhurst)	Selhurst Park	26,309
Everton	Liverpool (Walton)	Goodison Park	40,157
Ipswich Town	Ipswich	Portman Road	30,300
Leeds United	Leeds	Elland Road	40,204
Leicester City	Leicester	Filbert Street	22,000
Liverpool	Liverpool (Anfield)	Anfield	42,730
Manchester City	Manchester (Moss Side)	Maine Road	35,150
Manchester United	Manchester (Old Trafford)	Old Trafford	55,314
Newcastle United	Newcastle upon Tyne	St James' Park	36,649
Norwich City	Norwich	Carrow Road	27,010
Nottingham Forest	West Bridgford	City Ground	30,539
Queens Park Rangers	London (Shepherd's Bush)	Loftus Road	18,439
Sheffield Wednesday	Sheffield	Hillsborough Stadium	39,859
Southampton	Southampton	The Dell	15,200
Tottenham Hotspur	London (Tottenham)	White Hart Lane	36,230
West Ham United	London (Upton Park)	Boleyn Ground	28,000
Wimbledon	London (Selhurst)	Selhurst Park (Note: Due to Wimbledon lacking a home stadium, they played their home games at Selhurst Park, which is the home stadium of Crystal Palace.)	26,309

=== Personnel and kits ===
(as of 14 May 1995)

Team	Manager	Captain	Kit manufacturer	Shirt sponsor
Arsenal	(Scotland) Stewart Houston (caretaker)	(England) Tony Adams	Nike	JVC
Aston Villa	(England) Brian Little	(England) Kevin Richardson	Asics	Müller
Blackburn Rovers	(Scotland) Kenny Dalglish	(England) Tim Sherwood	Asics	McEwan's Lager
Chelsea	(England) Glenn Hoddle	(England) Dennis Wise	Umbro	Coors
Coventry City	(England) Ron Atkinson	(England) Brian Borrows	Pony	Peugeot
Crystal Palace	(England) Alan Smith	(England) Gareth Southgate	Nutmeg	TDK
Everton	(England) Joe Royle	(England) Dave Watson	Umbro	NEC
Ipswich Town	(Scotland) George Burley	(England) Steve Palmer	Umbro	Fisons
Leeds United	(England) Howard Wilkinson	(Scotland) Gary McAllister	Asics	Thistle Hotels
Leicester City	(Scotland) Mark McGhee	(England) Steve Walsh	Fox Leisure	Walkers
Liverpool	(England) Roy Evans	(Wales) Ian Rush	Adidas	Carlsberg
Manchester City	(England) Brian Horton	(England) Keith Curle	Umbro	Brother
Manchester United	(Scotland) Alex Ferguson	(England) Steve Bruce	Umbro	Sharp
Newcastle United	(England) Kevin Keegan	(England) Peter Beardsley	Asics	Newcastle Brown Ale (home); McEwan's Lager(away)
Norwich City	(England) Gary Megson (caretaker)	(England) Jon Newsome	Ribero	Norwich and Peterborough
Nottingham Forest	(England) Frank Clark	(England) Stuart Pearce	Umbro	Labatt's
Queens Park Rangers	(England) Ray Wilkins	(England) David Bardsley	Clubhouse	Compaq
Sheffield Wednesday	(England) Trevor Francis	(England) Chris Waddle	Puma	Sanderson
Southampton	(England) Alan Ball	(England) Matt Le Tissier	Pony	Dimplex
Tottenham Hotspur	(England) Gerry Francis	(England) Gary Mabbutt	Umbro	Holsten
West Ham United	(England) Harry Redknapp	(England) Steve Potts	Pony	Dagenham Motors
Wimbledon	(Republic of Ireland) Joe Kinnear	(Wales) Vinnie Jones	In-House	Elonex

=== Managerial changes ===
Team	Outgoing manager	Manner of departure	Date of vacancy	Position in table	Incoming manager	Date of appointment
West Ham United	(England) Billy Bonds	Resigned	10 August 1994	Pre-season	(England) Harry Redknapp	10 August 1994
Tottenham Hotspur	(Argentina) Osvaldo Ardiles	Sacked	1 November 1994	11th	(England) Steve Perryman (caretaker)	1 November 1994
Everton	(Wales) Mike Walker	Sacked	8 November 1994	22nd	(England) Joe Royle	10 November 1994
Aston Villa	(England) Ron Atkinson	Sacked	10 November 1994	19th	(England) Jim Barron (caretaker)	10 November 1994
Tottenham Hotspur	(England) Steve Perryman	End of caretaker spell	15 November 1994	13th	(England) Gerry Francis	15 November 1994
Queens Park Rangers	(England) Gerry Francis	Resigned	15 November 1994	18th	(England) Ray Wilkins	15 November 1994
Leicester City	(England) Brian Little	Resigned	22 November 1994	20th	(Scotland) Kevin MacDonald (caretaker)	22 November 1994
Aston Villa	(England) Jim Barron	End of caretaker spell	25 November 1994	19th	(England) Brian Little	25 November 1994
Ipswich Town	(England) John Lyall	Resigned	5 December 1994	22nd	(England) Paul Goddard (caretaker)	5 December 1994
Leicester City	(Scotland) Kevin MacDonald	End of caretaker spell	14 December 1994	21st	(Scotland) Mark McGhee	14 December 1994
Ipswich Town	(England) Paul Goddard	End of caretaker spell	28 December 1994	22nd	(Scotland) George Burley	28 December 1994
Coventry City	(England) Phil Neal	Sacked	14 February 1995	13th	(England) Ron Atkinson	15 February 1995
Arsenal	(Scotland) George Graham	Sacked	21 February 1995	12th	(Scotland) Stewart Houston	21 February 1995
Norwich City	(England) John Deehan	Resigned	9 April 1995	20th	(England) Gary Megson (caretaker)	9 April 1995

== League table ==
Pos	Team	Pld	W	D	L	GF	GA	GD	Pts	Qualification or relegation
1	Blackburn Rovers (C)	42	27	8	7	80	39	+41	89	Qualification for the Champions League group stage
2	Manchester United	42	26	10	6	77	28	+49	88	Qualification for the UEFA Cup first round (Note: Leeds United were rewarded entry to the UEFA Cup through UEFA Fair Play ranking.)
3	Nottingham Forest	42	22	11	9	72	43	+29	77	Qualification for the UEFA Cup first round
4	Liverpool	42	21	11	10	65	37	+28	74	Qualification for the UEFA Cup first round
5	Leeds United	42	20	13	9	59	38	+21	73	Qualification for the UEFA Cup first round
6	Newcastle United	42	20	12	10	67	47	+20	72	
7	Tottenham Hotspur	42	16	14	12	66	58	+8	62	Qualification for the Intertoto Cup group stage
8	Queens Park Rangers	42	17	9	16	61	59	+2	60	
9	Wimbledon	42	15	11	16	48	65	−17	56	Qualification for the Intertoto Cup group stage
10	Southampton	42	12	18	12	61	63	−2	54	
11	Chelsea	42	13	15	14	50	55	−5	54	
12	Arsenal	42	13	12	17	52	49	+3	51	
13	Sheffield Wednesday	42	13	12	17	49	57	−8	51	Qualification for the Intertoto Cup group stage
14	West Ham United	42	13	11	18	44	48	−4	50	
15	Everton	42	11	17	14	44	51	−7	50	Qualification for the Cup Winners' Cup first round (Note: Everton qualified for the Cup Winners' Cup as FA Cup winners.)
16	Coventry City	42	12	14	16	44	62	−18	50	
17	Manchester City	42	12	13	17	53	64	−11	49	
18	Aston Villa	42	11	15	16	51	56	−5	48	
19	Crystal Palace (R)	42	11	12	19	34	49	−15	45	Relegation to Football League First Division (Note: The Premier League relegated 4 teams while the Football League First Division only promoted 2 teams due to the Premier League contracting from 22 teams to 20 teams for the following season.)
20	Norwich City (R)	42	10	13	19	37	54	−17	43	Relegation to Football League First Division
21	Leicester City (R)	42	6	11	25	45	80	−35	29	Relegation to Football League First Division
22	Ipswich Town (R)	42	7	6	29	36	93	−57	27	Relegation to Football League First Division

Source: Premier League
Rules for classification: 1) points; 2) goal difference; 3) number of goals scored.
(C) Champions; (R) Relegated

== Results ==
Home \ Away	ARS	AVL	BLB	CHE	COV	CRY	EVE	IPS	LEE	LEI	LIV	MCI	MUN	NEW	NOR	NFO	QPR	SHW	SOU	TOT	WHU	WIM
Arsenal	—	0–0	0–0	3–1	2–1	1–2	1–1	4–1	1–3	1–1	0–1	3–0	0–0	2–3	5–1	1–0	1–3	0–0	1–1	1–1	0–1	0–0
Aston Villa	0–4	—	0–1	3–0	0–0	1–1	0–0	2–0	0–0	4–4	2–0	1–1	1–2	0–2	1–1	0–2	2–1	1–1	1–1	1–0	0–2	7–1
Blackburn Rovers	3–1	3–1	—	2–1	4–0	2–1	3–0	4–1	1–1	3–0	3–2	2–3	2–4	1–0	0–0	3–0	4–0	3–1	3–2	2–0	4–2	2–1
Chelsea	2–1	1–0	1–2	—	2–2	0–0	0–1	2–0	0–3	4–0	0–0	3–0	2–3	1–1	2–0	0–2	1–0	1–1	0–2	1–1	1–2	1–1
Coventry City	0–1	0–1	1–1	2–2	—	1–4	0–0	2–0	2–1	4–2	1–1	1–0	2–3	0–0	1–0	0–0	0–1	2–0	1–3	0–4	2–0	1–1
Crystal Palace	0–3	0–0	0–1	0–1	0–2	—	1–0	3–0	1–2	2–0	1–6	2–1	1–1	0–1	0–1	1–2	0–0	2–1	0–0	1–1	1–0	0–0
Everton	1–1	2–2	1–2	3–3	0–2	3–1	—	4–1	3–0	1–1	2–0	1–1	1–0	2–0	2–1	1–2	2–2	1–4	0–0	0–0	1–0	0–0
Ipswich Town	0–2	0–1	1–3	2–2	2–0	0–2	0–1	—	2–0	4–1	1–3	1–2	3–2	0–2	1–2	0–1	0–1	1–2	2–1	1–3	1–1	2–2
Leeds United	1–0	1–0	1–1	2–3	3–0	3–1	1–0	4–0	—	2–1	0–2	2–0	2–1	0–0	2–1	1–0	4–0	0–1	0–0	1–1	2–2	3–1
Leicester City	2–1	1–1	0–0	1–1	2–2	0–1	2–2	2–0	1–3	—	1–2	0–1	0–4	1–3	1–0	2–4	1–1	0–1	4–3	3–1	1–2	3–4
Liverpool	3–0	3–2	2–1	3–1	2–3	0–0	0–0	0–1	0–1	2–0	—	2–0	2–0	2–0	4–0	1–0	1–1	4–1	3–1	1–1	0–0	3–0
Manchester City	1–2	2–2	1–3	1–2	0–0	1–1	4–0	2–0	0–0	0–1	2–1	—	0–3	0–0	2–0	3–3	2–3	3–2	3–3	5–2	3–0	2–0
Manchester United	3–0	1–0	1–0	0–0	2–0	3–0	2–0	9–0	0–0	1–1	2–0	5–0	—	2–0	1–0	1–2	2–0	1–0	2–1	0–0	1–0	3–0
Newcastle United	1–0	3–1	1–1	4–2	4–0	3–2	2–0	1–1	1–2	3–1	1–1	0–0	1–1	—	3–0	2–1	2–1	2–1	5–1	3–3	2–0	2–1
Norwich City	0–0	1–1	2–1	3–0	2–2	0–0	0–0	3–0	2–1	2–1	1–2	1–1	0–2	2–1	—	0–1	4–2	0–0	2–2	0–2	1–0	1–2
Nottingham Forest	2–2	1–2	0–2	0–1	2–0	1–0	2–1	4–1	3–0	1–0	1–1	1–0	1–1	0–0	1–0	—	3–2	4–1	3–0	2–2	1–1	3–1
Queens Park Rangers	3–1	2–0	0–1	1–0	2–2	0–1	2–3	1–2	3–2	2–0	2–1	1–2	2–3	3–0	2–0	1–1	—	3–2	2–2	2–1	2–1	0–1
Sheffield Wednesday	3–1	1–2	0–1	1–1	5–1	1–0	0–0	4–1	1–1	1–0	1–2	1–1	1–0	0–0	0–0	1–7	0–2	—	1–1	3–4	1–0	0–1
Southampton	1–0	2–1	1–1	0–1	0–0	3–1	2–0	3–1	1–3	2–2	0–2	2–2	2–2	3–1	1–1	1–1	2–1	0–0	—	4–3	1–1	2–3
Tottenham Hotspur	1–0	3–4	3–1	0–0	1–3	0–0	2–1	3–0	1–1	1–0	0–0	2–1	0–1	4–2	1–0	1–4	1–1	3–1	1–2	—	3–1	1–2
West Ham United	0–2	1–0	2–0	1–2	0–1	1–0	2–2	1–1	0–0	1–0	3–0	3–0	1–1	1–3	2–2	3–1	0–0	0–2	2–0	1–2	—	3–0
Wimbledon	1–3	4–3	0–3	1–1	2–0	2–0	2–1	1–1	0–0	2–1	0–0	2–0	0–1	3–2	1–0	2–2	1–3	0–1	0–2	1–2	1–0	—

Source: Premier League
Legend: Blue = home team win; Yellow = draw; Red = away team win.

== Season statistics ==
=== Top scorers ===
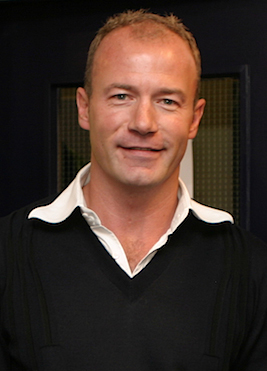
Blackburn's Alan Shearer was the top scorer in the 1994–95 Premier League season, with 34 goals.

Rank	Player	Club(s)	Goals
1	(England) Alan Shearer	Blackburn Rovers	34
2	(England) Robbie Fowler	Liverpool	25
3	(England) Les Ferdinand	Queens Park Rangers	24
4	(England) Stan Collymore	Nottingham Forest	22
5	(England) Andy Cole	Newcastle United; Manchester United	21 (9/12)
6	(Germany) Jürgen Klinsmann	Tottenham Hotspur	20
7	(England) Matt Le Tissier	Southampton	19
8	(England) Teddy Sheringham	Tottenham Hotspur	18
8	(England) Ian Wright	Arsenal	18
10	(Germany) Uwe Rösler	Manchester City	15
10	(Wales) Dean Saunders	Aston Villa	15
10	(England) Chris Sutton	Blackburn Rovers	15

==== Hat-tricks ====
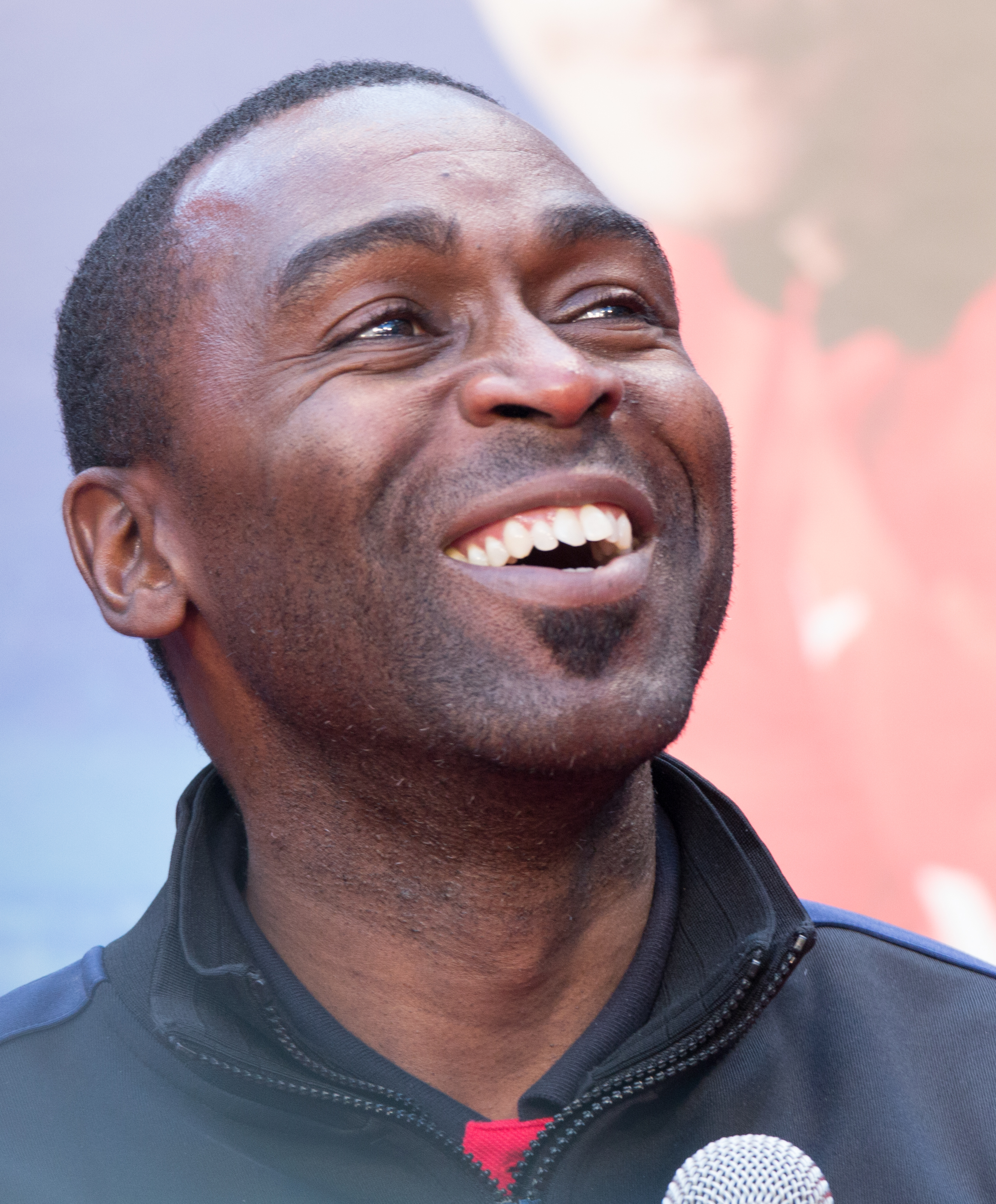
In addition to his hat-trick, Manchester United's Andy Cole became the first player to score five goals in a Premier League match.

Player	For	Against	Result	Date
(England) Chris Sutton	Blackburn Rovers	Coventry City	4–0 (H)	27 August 1994
(England) Robbie Fowler	Liverpool	Arsenal	3–0 (H)	28 August 1994
(Russia) Andrei Kanchelskis	Manchester United	Manchester City	5–0 (H)	10 November 1994
(England) Alan Shearer	Blackburn Rovers	Queens Park Rangers	4–0 (H)	26 November 1994
(England) Teddy Sheringham	Tottenham Hotspur	Newcastle United	4–2 (H)	3 December 1994
(England) Tony Cottee	West Ham United	Manchester City	3–0 (H)	17 December 1994
(England) Alan Shearer	Blackburn Rovers	West Ham United	4–2 (H)	30 October 1994
(England) Alan Shearer	Blackburn Rovers	Ipswich Town	4–1 (H)	2 January 1995
(England) Tommy Johnson	Aston Villa	Wimbledon	7–1 (H)	11 February 1995
(England) Andy Cole^{5}	Manchester United	Ipswich Town	9–0 (H)	4 March 1995
(Zimbabwe) Peter Ndlovu	Coventry City	Liverpool	3–2 (A)	14 March 1995
(Ghana) Tony Yeboah	Leeds United	Ipswich Town	4–0 (H)	5 April 1995
(England) Ian Wright	Arsenal	Ipswich Town	4–1 (H)	15 April 1995

Note: ^{5} – player scored 5 goals; (H) – Home; (A) – Away

=== Clean sheets ===
Rank	Player	Club	Clean sheets
1	(Denmark) Peter Schmeichel	Manchester United	20
2	(England) David James	Liverpool	17
2	(England) John Lukic	Leeds United	17
4	(England) Tim Flowers	Blackburn	16
5	(England) Nigel Martyn	Crystal Palace	14
5	(Wales) Neville Southall	Everton	14
7	(Wales) Mark Crossley	Nottingham Forest	13
7	(Czech Republic) Luděk Mikloško	West Ham United	13
7	(Czech Republic) Pavel Srníček	Newcastle United	13
10	(Russia) Dmitri Kharine	Chelsea	11
10	(England) Steve Ogrizovic	Coventry City	11
10	(England) David Seaman	Arsenal	11
10	(England) Ian Walker	Tottenham Hotspur	11

=== Discipline ===
==== Player ====
- Most yellow cards: 12
  - (England) Francis Benali (Southampton)
  - (Netherlands) Ken Monkou (Southampton)
  - (England) Andy Pearce (Sheffield Wednesday)
- Most red cards: 2
  - (Scotland) Duncan Ferguson (Everton)
  - (Wales) Vinnie Jones (Wimbledon)
  - (Czech Republic) Pavel Srníček (Newcastle United)
  - (Republic of Ireland) Andy Townsend (Aston Villa)
  - (England) Jason Wilcox (Blackburn Rovers)

==== Club ====
- Most yellow cards: 72
  - Wimbledon
- Fewest yellow cards: 35
  - Liverpool
- Most red cards: 8
  - Leicester City
- Fewest red cards: 0
  - Leeds United
  - Southampton

== Awards ==
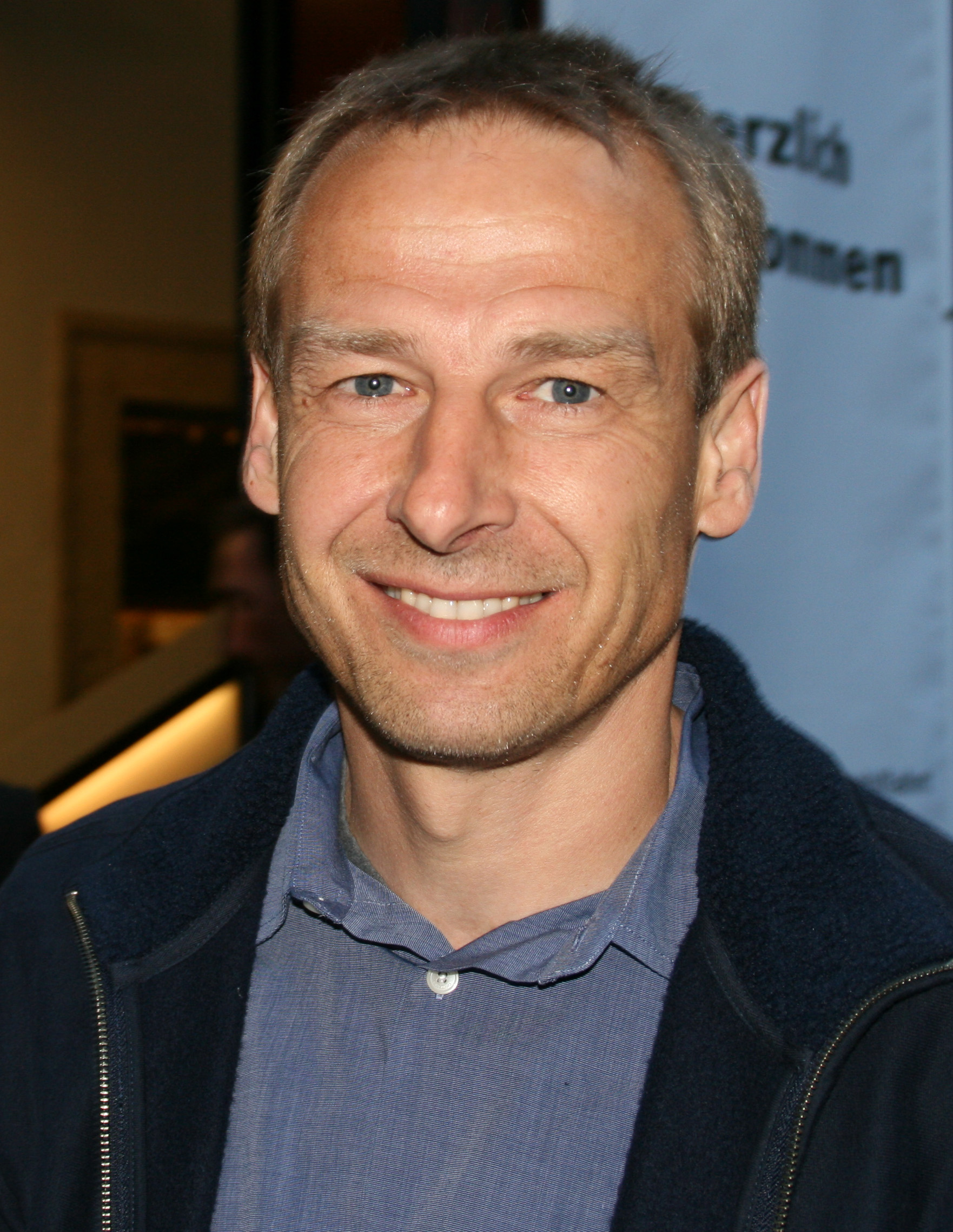
Tottenham's Jürgen Klinsmann was the inaugural Player of the Month.

=== Monthly awards ===
Month	Manager of the Month		Player of the Month	
Month	Manager	Club	Player	Club
August	(England) Kevin Keegan	Newcastle United	(Germany) Jürgen Klinsmann	Tottenham Hotspur
September	(England) Frank Clark	Nottingham Forest	(England) Rob Lee	Newcastle United
October	(Scotland) Alex Ferguson	Manchester United	(England) Paul Ince	Manchester United
November	(Scotland) Kenny Dalglish	Blackburn Rovers	(England) Alan Shearer	Blackburn Rovers
November	(Scotland) Kenny Dalglish	Blackburn Rovers	(England) Chris Sutton	Blackburn Rovers
December	(England) Gerry Francis	Tottenham Hotspur	(England) Matt Le Tissier	Southampton
January	(England) Brian Little	Aston Villa	(England) Chris Waddle	Sheffield Wednesday
February	(England) Kevin Keegan	Newcastle United	(Scotland) Duncan Ferguson	Everton
March	(England) Ron Atkinson	Coventry City	(Ghana) Tony Yeboah	Leeds United
April	(England) Howard Wilkinson	Leeds United	(England) David Seaman	Arsenal

=== Annual awards ===
PFA Team of the Year

Award	Winner	Club
Premier League Manager of the Season	(Scotland) Kenny Dalglish	Blackburn Rovers
Premier League Player of the Season	(England) Alan Shearer	Blackburn Rovers
PFA Players' Player of the Year	(England) Alan Shearer	Blackburn Rovers
PFA Young Player of the Year	(England) Robbie Fowler	Liverpool
FWA Footballer of the Year	(Germany) Jürgen Klinsmann	Tottenham Hotspur

PFA Team of the Year
Goalkeeper	(England) Tim Flowers (Blackburn Rovers)			
Defenders	(England) Rob Jones (Liverpool)	(England) Gary Pallister (Manchester United)	(Scotland) Colin Hendry (Blackburn Rovers)	(England) Graeme Le Saux (Blackburn Rovers)
Midfielders	(England) Tim Sherwood (Blackburn Rovers)		(England) Matt Le Tissier (Southampton)	(England) Paul Ince (Manchester United)
Forwards	(Germany) Jürgen Klinsmann (Tottenham Hotspur)		(England) Alan Shearer (Blackburn Rovers)	(England) Chris Sutton (Blackburn Rovers)

== Attendances ==
Manchester United drew the highest average home attendance in the third edition of the Premier League.

#	Football club	Home games	Average attendance
1	Manchester United	21	43,677
2	Arsenal FC	21	35,353
3	Newcastle United	21	34,692
4	Liverpool FC	21	34,225
5	Leeds United	21	32,798
6	Everton FC	21	30,894
7	Aston Villa	21	29,756
8	Tottenham Hotspur	21	27,259
9	Sheffield Wednesday	21	26,568
10	Blackburn Rovers	21	25,272
11	Nottingham Forest	21	23,633
12	Manchester City	21	22,655
13	Chelsea FC	21	21,057
14	West Ham United	21	20,223
15	Leicester City	21	19,532
16	Norwich City	21	18,625
17	Ipswich Town	21	16,880
18	Coventry City	21	15,979
19	Crystal Palace FC	21	14,879
20	Southampton FC	21	14,685
21	Queens Park Rangers	21	14,637
22	Wimbledon FC	21	10,207

== See also ==
- 1994–95 in English football
