= Professional sports league organization =

Organization of professional sports leagues

Professional sports leagues are organized in numerous ways. The two most significant types are one that developed in Europe, characterized by a tiered structure using promotion and relegation in order to determine participation in a hierarchy of leagues or divisions, and a North American originated model characterized by its use of franchises, closed memberships, and minor leagues. Both these systems remain most common in their area of origin, although both systems are used worldwide.

== Etymology ==
The term league has many different meanings in different areas around the world, and its use for different concepts can make comparisons confusing. Usually a league is a group of teams that play each other during the season. It is also often used for the name of the governing body that oversees the league, as in America's Major League Baseball or England's Football League. Because most European football clubs participate in different competitions during a season, regular-season home-and-away games are often referred to as league games and the others as non-league or cup games, even though the separate competitions may be organized by the same governing body. Also, there is a rugby football code called rugby league, which is distinct from rugby union.

== Structure of North American leagues (franchise and minor league system) ==
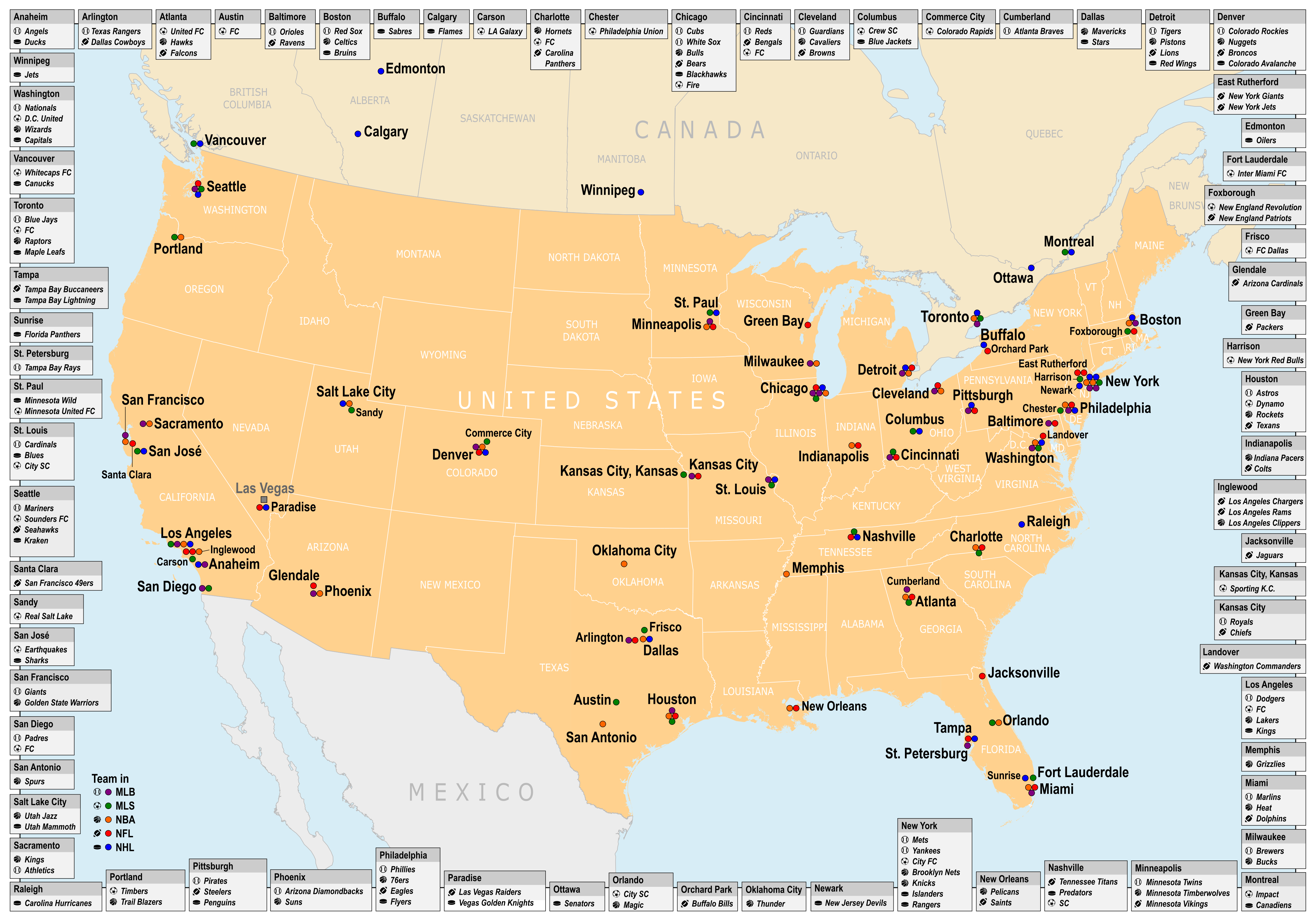
All cities in the US and Canada with at least one team in MLB, NBA, NFL, NHL, and MLS in 2025

Professional sports leagues in North America comprise a stipulated number of teams, known as franchises, which field one team each. The franchises have territorial rights, usually exclusive territories large enough to cover major metropolitan areas, so that they have no local rivals. New teams may enter the competition only by a vote of current members; typically, a new place is put up for bid by would-be owners. The "franchise system" was introduced in baseball with the formation of the National League in 1876 (Note: Before 1876, baseball clubs joined the professional class (1869–1870) or the professional association by announcing their intentions and paying any required fees, an open system.) and later adopted by the other North American leagues.

Although member teams are corporate entities separate from their leagues, they operate only under league auspices. North American teams do not play competitive games against outside opponents.

The leagues operate in a closed membership system and do not have promotion and relegation. It is organized in a way that assures the teams' continued existence in the league from year to year. On occasion a league may decide to grow by admitting a new expansion team into the league. Most of the teams in the four major North American leagues were created as part of a planned league expansion or through the merger of a rival league. Only one team in the National Hockey League (the Montreal Canadiens), for example, existed before becoming part of the NHL. The rest of the teams were created ex novo as expansion teams or as charter members of the World Hockey Association, which merged with the NHL in 1979.

American and Canadian sports leagues typically have a "playoff" system where the best teams in a given season compete in a tournament, with the winner being crowned champion of the league for that season. These have their roots in the long travel distances common in US and Canadian sports; to cut down on travel, leagues are typically divided into geographic divisions and feature unbalanced schedules with teams playing more matches against opponents in the same division. Due to this, not all teams face the same opponents, and some teams may not meet during a regular season at all. This results in teams with identical records that have faced different opponents differing numbers of times, making team records alone an imperfect measure of league supremacy.

- Major League Soccer is technically not an association of franchises but a single business entity, though each team has an owner-operator; the team owners are actually shareholders in the league. The league, not the individual teams, contracts with the players. Unlike teams in the four traditional major North American sports leagues, MLS teams play meaningful games against teams from other nations. The MLS season serves as a qualifier for the CONCACAF Champions Cup, featuring teams from throughout the northern half of the Americas, including the Caribbean. Starting in 2023, all MLS teams play in the Leagues Cup, a competition also involving all sides in Mexico's top flight of Liga MX that serves as an additional qualifier for the Champions Cup. Also, MLS uses playing rules set by the international governing body of its sport. MLS followed its own playing rules until 2004, when it adopted FIFA rules. Under the auspices of US Soccer and the Canadian Soccer Association, respectively, the U.S. and Canada have had separate knockout cup competitions during the MLS season that include teams from lower leagues. In the U.S., the U.S. Open Cup has had MLS participation from the league's inception; since the 2012 cup, each competition has featured all American-based MLS sides. However, after the 2023 season the MLS announced it would no longer send MLS first teams to the US Open Cup - opting to send sides from its developmental league - MLS Next Pro instead. Canada's MLS teams will continue to compete in the Canadian Championship as before. However, the league structure of MLS follows the North American model, with a single premier league and no promotion or relegation.

Major League Rugby, which began play in 2018 as the second attempt to launch a professional rugby union competition in the U.S., has a business structure identical to that of MLS. It is a single business entity, with each team owner-operator being a league shareholder, and all player contracts are held by the league. Also similar to MLS, MLR uses playing rules set by its sport's international governing body. However, MLR teams do not play competitive matches against teams from other leagues, and there is currently no cup competition in U.S. rugby similar to soccer's U.S. Open Cup. The MLR league structure also follows the North American model of one premier league without promotion and relegation.

A more rarely seen business model in North America is the pure single-entity league, typified by the two incarnations of the XFL, where there are no individual owners or investors, with all teams centrally owned and operated by the league. Many upstart leagues begin their existence as pure single-entity leagues before they secure investors for teams (such as the Professional Women's Hockey League and its de facto predecessor, the Premier Hockey Federation) or are forced to operate in the pure single-entity model when investors fail to materialize (such as the Stars Football League).

Many North American systems have a secondary or minor league but without promotion and relegation of teams between them. Often a minor league team is partly or wholly owned by a major league team, or affiliated with one, and utilized for player development. For example, Major League Baseball operates Minor League Baseball. The minor clubs do not move up or down in the hierarchy by on-field success or failure. Professional ice hockey has a system somewhat similar to baseball's (without as many levels), while the National Basketball Association operates a single NBA G League. The National Football League does not have a minor league system as of 2024 but it has operated or affiliated with minor leagues in the 1930s, 1940s, 1960s, 1990s, and the early 2000s and invested in one in the late 2000s.

Men's soccer has multiple minor leagues. The United Soccer League operates two of these, the second-level USL Championship and the third-level USL League One. Major League Soccer operates the third-level MLS Next Pro, consisting primarily of reserve sides of MLS teams. Another third-level league, the National Independent Soccer Association, is totally independent. None have a promotion/relegation system, although many teams have moved between levels, either by invitation or by choice.

To prevent conflicts of interest, most North American sports leagues that operate on the franchise system do not allow individual owners to hold an interest in more than one franchise at once. Most such leagues also use revenue sharing and a salary cap in an effort to maintain a level of parity between franchises.

== Structure of European leagues (promotion and relegation system) ==
Football in England developed a very different system from that in North America, and it has been adopted for football in most other European countries, as well as to many other sports founded in Europe and played across the world. The features of the system are:

- The existence of an elected governing body to which clubs at all levels of the sport belong.
- The promotion of well-performing teams to higher-level leagues or divisions and the relegation of poorly performing teams to lower-level leagues or divisions.
- Matches played both inside and outside of leagues.

European football clubs are members both of a league and of a governing body. In the case of England, all competitive football clubs are members of The Football Association, while the top 20 teams also are members of the Premier League, a separate organization. The 72 teams in the three levels below the Premier League are members of still another body, the English Football League. The FA operates the national football team and tournaments that involve teams from different leagues (except the EFL Cup, operated by the English Football League and open to its own teams and those in the Premier League). In conjunction with FIFA and other countries' governing bodies, it also sets the playing rules and the rules under which teams can sell players' contracts to other clubs.

The rules or Laws of the Game are determined by the International Football Association Board.

The Premier League negotiates television contracts for its games. However, although the national league would be the dominating competition in which a club might participate, there are many non-league fixtures a club might play in a given year. In European football there are national cup competitions, which are single elimination knock-out tournaments, are played every year and all the clubs in the league participate. Also, the best performing clubs from the previous year may participate in pan-European tournaments such as the UEFA Champions League, operated by the Union of European Football Associations. A Premier League team might play a league game one week, and an FA Cup game against a team from a lower-level league the next, followed by an EFL Cup game against a team in the EFL, and then a fourth game might be against a team from across Europe in the Champions League.

The promotion and relegation system is generally used to determine membership of leagues. Most commonly, a pre-determined number of teams that finish at the bottom of a league or division are automatically dropped down, or relegated, to a lower level for the next season. They are replaced by teams who are promoted from that lower tier either by finishing with the best records or by winning a playoff. In England, in the 2010–2011 season, the teams Birmingham City, Blackpool and West Ham United were relegated from the Premier League to the Football League Championship, the second level of English football. They were replaced by the top two teams from the second level, Queens Park Rangers and Norwich City, both of which won automatic promotion, as well as Swansea City (a Welsh club that plays in the English system), which won a playoff tournament of the teams that finished third through sixth. In the 2011–12 season, the teams Wolverhampton Wanderers, Blackburn, and Bolton were relegated to the Championship. They were replaced by Reading, Southampton, and West Ham. The two former teams had won automatic promotion, while the latter occupied the last promotion spot when they defeated Cardiff 5–0 on aggregate in the semifinals, and defeated Blackpool 2–1 at the final in Wembley Stadium.

The system originated in England in 1888 when twelve clubs decided to create a professional Football League. It then expanded by merging with the Football Alliance in 1892, with the majority of the Alliance teams occupying the lower Second Division, due to the divergent strengths of the teams. As this differential was overcome over the next five years, the winners of the Second Division went into a playoff with the worst placed team in the First Division, and if they won, were promoted into the top tier. The first club to achieve promotion was Sheffield United, which replaced the relegated Accrington F.C.

Relegation often has devastating financial consequences for club owners who not only lose TV, sponsorship and gate income but may also see the asset value of their shares in the club collapse. Some leagues offer a "parachute payment" to its relegated teams for the following years in order to protect them from bankruptcy. If a team is promoted back to the higher tier the following year then the parachute payment for the second season is distributed among the teams of the lower division. There is of course a corresponding bonanza for promoted clubs.

The league does not choose which cities are to have teams in the top division. For example, Leeds, the fourth-biggest city in England, saw their team, Leeds United, relegated from the Premier League to the Championship in 2004, and went without top-flight football for 16 seasons before United returned to the Premier League in 2020. During this period, United were relegated again to the third-tier League One in 2007 and returned to the Championship in 2010. Any city that loses all of its Premier League clubs to relegation will continue to be without a club in the top league until a local club plays well enough to be promoted into the Premiership. Famously, the French Ligue 1 lacked a team from Paris, France's capital and largest city, for some years. Likewise, Berlin clubs in the Bundesliga have been rare, due to the richer clubs being all located in the former West Germany.

As well as having no right to being in a certain tier, a club also has no territorial rights to its own area. A successful new team in a geographical location can come to dominate the incumbents. In Munich, for example, TSV 1860 München were initially more successful than the city's current biggest team Bayern München. As of the current 2024–25 season, London has 13 teams in the top four league levels, including seven Premier League teams.

Clubs may be sold privately to new owners at any time, but this does not happen often where clubs are based on community membership and agreement. Such clubs require agreement from members who, unlike shareholders of corporations, have priorities other than money when it comes to their football club such as tradition or local identity. For similar reasons, relocation of clubs to other cities is very rare. This is mostly because virtually all cities and towns in Europe have a football club of some sort, the size and strength of the club usually relative to the town's size and importance. Buying an existing top-flight club and moving it to a new location is problematic, as the supporters of the town's original club are unlikely to switch allegiance to an interloper. This means anyone wanting ownership of a high ranked club in their native city must buy a local club as it stands and work it up through the divisions, usually by hiring better talent. There have been some cases where existing owners have chosen to relocate out of a difficult market, to better facilities, or to realize the market value of the land that the current stadium is built upon (A famous example being the Relocation of Wimbledon F.C. to Milton Keynes). As in the U.S., team relocations have been controversial as supporters of the club will protest at its loss.

== Systems around the world ==
Leagues around the world generally follow one or the other of these systems with some variation. Most sport leagues in Australia are similar to the North American model, using post-season playoffs and no relegation, but without geographical divisions, with the most notable examples being the Australian Football League (Aussie rules) and National Rugby League (rugby league). Nippon Professional Baseball in Japan uses the North American system due to American influence on the game. In cricket, the Indian Premier League, launched in 2008, also operates on this system. The Super League, which is the top level of rugby league in the United Kingdom and France (and included a Canadian team for several years), was run on a franchise basis from 2009 to 2014, but returned to a promotion-relegation model with the 2015 season. Another example of a franchised league in European sport is ice hockey's Kontinental Hockey League, centered mainly in Russia with teams also located in Belarus, China, and Kazakhstan. Rugby union also has a European-based franchised league in the United Rugby Championship (historically the Celtic League, Pro12, and Pro14). It was founded with teams in the Celtic nations of Ireland, Scotland, and Wales, and later added teams outside those nations, first from Italy and then South Africa.

The promotion-relegation system is widely used in football around the world, notably in Africa and Latin America as well as Europe. The most notable variation has developed in Latin America where many countries have two league seasons per year, which scheduling allows because many Latin American nations lack a national cup competition. Another notable variation is the Brazilian system of two parallel league systems each with its own separate promotion and relegation, one national and another on state-level, the same teams play both leagues each year.

The European model is also used in Europe even when the sports were founded in America, showing that the league system adopted is not determined by the sport itself, but more on the tradition of sports organization in that region. Sports such as basketball in Spain and Lithuania use promotion and relegation. In the same vein, Australia's A-League Men does not use the pyramid structure normally found in football, but instead follows the tradition of Australian sports having a franchise model and a post-season playoff system. This model better suits a country with a few important central locations where a sport needs to ensure there is a team playing with no risk of relegation. Likewise, rugby union's Super Rugby Pacific features 12 teams playing in a closed league, although it does not operate with a strict system of franchising as in North America, as there is no system of territorial rights and limited private ownership. Australia has four teams; New Zealand has six (one of which acts as a development team for the Samoan and Tongan national sides); and Fiji has one. Super Rugby also formerly featured teams based in South Africa, Japan, and Argentina.

Many local sporting leagues in Australia and New Zealand operate without a system of promotion-and-relegation, although the term "franchise" is never used in connection with these leagues as they are almost exclusively contested by clubs that are controlled by their members.

In east Asia, places such as Japan, China, South Korea and Taiwan have a particular differentiation among leagues: "European" sports such as football and rugby use promotion and relegation, while "American" sports such as baseball and basketball use franchising and minor leagues, with a few differences varying from country to country. A similar situation exists in countries in Central America and the Caribbean, where football and baseball share several close markets.

== Historical comparisons ==
A major factor in the development of the North American closed membership system during the 19th Century was the distances between cities, with some teams separated by half of the North American continent, resulting in high traveling costs. When the National League of Professional Base Ball Clubs was established in 1876, its founders judged that in order to prosper, they must make baseball's highest level of competition a "closed shop", with a strict limit on the number of teams, and with each member having exclusive local rights. This guarantee of a place in the league year after year would permit each club owner to monopolize fan bases in their respective exclusive territories and give them the confidence to invest in infrastructure, such as improved ballparks. This in turn would guarantee the revenues needed to support traveling across the continent.

In contrast, the shorter distances between urban areas in England allowed more clubs to develop large fan bases without incurring the same travel costs as in North America. When The Football League, now known as the English Football League, was founded in 1888, it was not intended to be a rival of The Football Association but rather the top competition within it. The new league was not universally accepted as England's top-calibre competition right away. To help win fans of clubs outside The Football League, a system was established in which the worst teams at the end of each season would need to win re-election against any clubs wishing to join. A rival league, the Football Alliance, was then formed in 1889. When the two merged in 1892, it was not on equal terms; rather, most of the Alliance clubs were put in the new Football League Second Division, whose best teams would move up to the First Division in place of its worst teams. Another merger, with the top division of the Southern League in 1920, helped form the Third Division in similar fashion, firmly establishing the principle of promotion and relegation.

== See also ==
- Gate receipts
- History of baseball
- Football in England
- Football in France
- Football in Italy
- Football in Germany
- Football in Australia
- European Football
- Football in Spain
- Football in Serbia
- Football in the Netherlands
- Football in Portugal
- Football in Scotland
- Rugby Football League
- EuroHockey Club Champions Cup
- Handball-Bundesliga
- Liga ASOBAL
- EHF Cup
- List of largest sports contracts
- List of professional sports leagues
