= History of Leeds United F.C. =

History of an English football club

The history of Leeds United Football Club, a professional association football club based in the city of Leeds, West Yorkshire, England, dates back to 1919, when the club was established following the demise of Leeds City F.C.

Leeds had their most successful period under the management of Don Revie in the 1960s and 1970s. The club won the English league title twice, the FA Cup once, the League Cup once and the Inter-Cities Fairs Cup twice and Charity Shield in 1969. They were also finalists in the European Cup Winners Cup in 1973 and the European Cup in 1975. Leeds later won another league title in 1991–92 under manager Howard Wilkinson followed by the Charity Shield also in 1992.

== Leeds City ==
Leeds United's predecessor club, Leeds City F.C., was formed in 1904, but was forcibly disbanded by The Football League in 1919 in response to allegations of financial irregularities regarding illegal payments to players during the First World War.

== Formation of Leeds United ==
Shortly after the disbanding of Leeds City a new club, Leeds United, was formed on 17 October 1919, under the management of former player Dick Ray. They began playing in the Midland League, taking the place vacated by Leeds City's reserve team. Yorkshire Amateurs, who occupied Elland Road, offered to make way for the new team.

In 1920 Leeds United were acquired by Huddersfield Town's chairman Hilton Crowther. Crowther planned to amalgamate Huddersfield Town and Leeds United, but a public outcry in the Huddersfield press prevented this; eventually, enough money was raised in Huddersfield to buy Crowther out, leaving him to concentrate solely on Leeds United.

On 31 May 1920 Leeds United were elected to the Football League; they polled 31 votes and entered the Second Division along with Cardiff City, who won 23 votes.

Due to the connection with Huddersfield, Leeds adopted the home colours of Huddersfield for their first home kit.

== 1919–29 ==
Honours Won: Second Division Championship (1923–24)

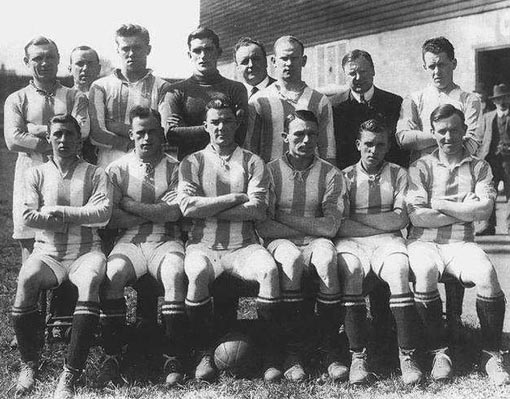
The first Leeds United league squad

Leeds first manager was former Leeds City player Dick Ray, but chairman Hilton Crowther wasted no time in enlisting the Huddersfield boss Arthur Fairclough as his replacement; Ray was appointed as Fairclough's assistant.

Leeds' first fixture after their election to the league was against Port Vale, the club who had taken up Leeds City's fixtures following their expulsion. Leeds lost the game 2–0, but seven days later recorded their first victory in the corresponding fixture at Elland Road, which ended Leeds United 3 Port Vale 1. However, Leeds made little impact in 1920–21, their first season, eventually finishing 14th. Following seasons saw them consolidate their position in the league, finishing 8th in 1921–22 and 7th in 1922–23, before winning the Second Division Championship in 1923–24 with 54 points. The championship winning team was a strong one, with Jim Baker, Bert Duffield and Ernie Hart featuring prominently.

Leeds struggled during their First Division debut season in 1924–25 and finished in 18th place. The following 1925–26 season was even more of a struggle, and the club only just avoided relegation. The 1926–27 season finally saw Leeds relegated to Second Division, and Fairclough resigned as manager. His replacement was his former assistant Dick Ray, who had left Elland Road in 1923 to manage Doncaster Rovers.

In 1927–28, Ray's first season, Leeds were promoted back to the First Division, finishing as runners-up to Manchester City. The team did well on its return to the First Division, eventually finishing 13th in 1928–29.

The following season, 1929–30, Leeds finished 5th – the club's best position before the arrival of Don Revie. The half-back line of George Reed, Willis Edwards and Ernie Hart provided a strong defensive backbone to an attacking side spearheaded by Tom Jennings. The side was further enhanced by Wilf Copping, who joined in the close season.

== 1930s ==
Leeds were inconsistent; after their best ever finish, the club were relegated in the following 1930–31 season. The following 1931–32 season saw Leeds promoted back to the First Division, finishing runners-up to Wolverhampton Wanderers. On their return to the First Division, Leeds managed to finish 8th in the 1932–33 season, and 9th in 1933–34.

Wilf Copping left for Arsenal in 1934, and his absence made a big difference as Leeds slumped to 18th place in 1934–35. Dick Ray resigned as manager, and was replaced by Billy Hampson. Hampson went for experience and recruited former England internationals, such as Albert McInroy and George Brown. He also introduced promising youngsters Bert Sproston, Billy Furness and Eric Stephenson, who went on to play for England. In the 1934–35 season, Leeds adopted a half yellow-half blue strip, in tribute to the defunct Leeds City, and this kit stayed in place until 1948, with several variations on the colours being used between then and 1960–61. The club also adopted their first badge in 1934, using the city crest.

1935–36 saw the club achieve a respectable 11th place in the table, but 1936–37 brought another slump as Leeds finished 19th. 1937–38 saw an improvement and Leeds were even up amongst the title challengers in the early part of the season, with South African striker Gordon Hodgson scoring 25 goals in 36 League games. However, the side faded, and eventually finished 9th.

1938–39 was the last full season before World War II, and Leeds finished 13th.

== 1946–49 ==
In the 1946–47 season after the War, Leeds United won just 18 points – the equal lowest First Division total until Stoke City's performance in 1984–85. They also recorded what remains to this day the worst away record in top-flight history, having gained just a single point from 21 away matches. Once relegation to the Second Division was confirmed, manager Billy Hampson was replaced by former player Willis Edwards.

Edwards proved to be a poor manager, and the 1947–48 season was a struggle against relegation to the Third Division. After just a year in charge, Edwards was moved back to the post of assistant manager, and the Leeds board appointed Major Frank Buckley.

== 1948–53 Frank Buckley: challenging for promotion ==
Buckley had previously managed Wolverhampton Wanderers to a runners-up position in the league, and to the FA Cup Final. However, his first season in charge of Leeds was another relegation battle, with Leeds eventually finishing 15th in the 1948–49 season that saw John Charles make his league debut.

The following 1949–50 season saw Buckley clear much of the dead wood from the side, replacing them with younger, fitter players. Buckley's new side finished a creditable 5th in the Second Division, and enjoyed a run to the 6th round of the FA Cup. The season also saw Leeds sign a 15-year-old Jack Charlton.

The 1950–51 season was another period of transition for the club; Buckley continued to rebuild, with only seven original players remaining from the squad he had inherited in 1948, and Leeds eventually finished 5th.

The 1951–52 season saw Leeds finish 6th in the table. By this time, Buckley had grown steadily more frustrated with the inability of some players in the squad to fulfil their potential, whilst the lack of funds from the board made radical action impossible. Buckley's scouting and youth programmes were bringing talent through, but it was taking too long.

Buckley was 68 at the start of the 1952–53, and aware that the board was impatient for promotion. He switched Charles from his usual defensive position to a centre forward role, and was rewarded with 27 goals in 29 appearances. The season also saw Jack Charlton making his debut at centre back, replacing Charles. It was not enough; the previously tight defense missed Charles, and Leeds finished the season in 10th place. After five years as manager, Buckley resigned at the end of the season to take over at Walsall Town.

== 1953–57 Raich Carter: promotion realised ==
The Leeds board replaced Buckley with former England legend Raich Carter. Initially, the new manager caused unrest among the players; Carter was convinced of his abilities, but scathing and dismissive in his put downs of the players, whom he deemed lesser talents. Team spirit suffered as he lavished all his attention on John Charles, who rewarded his manager's devotion with 42 goals in 39 games. Despite the goals, Leeds were still erratic, and finished the 1953–54 season in 10th position.

The 1954–55 season saw the club settle down into a winning routine under Carter, eventually finishing 4th and missing out on promotion by just one point. However, Charles was unsettled by attention from First Division clubs, and submitted a written Transfer Request, which was rejected by the board.

Carter switched Charles back to defence for the 1955–56 season, and Leeds finished as Second Division runners-up – returning to the First Division for the first time since 1947. Team regulars included Charlton, Eric Kerfoot, Jimmy Dunn and Grenville Hair.

Leed's return to the First Division in the 1956–57 season saw them finish a creditable 8th, with John Charles playing a pivotal role. However, in September 1956, fire gutted the West Stand at Elland Road; the fire was so ferocious that large sections of the pitch were scorched by the heat. The blaze consumed the entire structure, offices, kit, club records, physiotherapy equipment, dressing rooms, directors' rooms and the press box. Damage was estimated at £100,000, and the club's insurance cover had been woefully inadequate. In order to raise funds to replace the stand, the club's directors reluctantly listened to offers for Charles. Carter did his best to persuade his star player to stay, but Charles was hungry for success at the highest level, and Carter was unable to convince him that Leeds could satisfy his ambitions. Charles was sold to Juventus for a then world record of £65,000.

The loss of such a key player was reflected in the performances on the pitch, and the following 1957–58 season saw Leeds finish in 17th place. At the end of the season, the club directors decided not to renew Carter's contract after just one season in the top flight.

== 1958–61: decline and relegation ==
Bill Lambton took over as acting manager at Leeds for the 1958–59 season. Lambton had been hired by Carter the previous season, and had no experience of running a football club. He had not been a great success as coach and commanded little respect among the playing staff. A player rebellion saw the board sack Lambton in January 1959, and former manager Willis Edwards resumed the manager's chair on a temporary basis, aided by trainer Bob Roxburgh, and Leeds managed to avoid relegation, eventually finishing 15th. Lambton's main legacy was the signing of former England international Don Revie, who was then ending his playing career.

Lambton's eventual successor was Jack Taylor, who had managed Queens Park Rangers without conspicuous success and the club were relegated to the Second Division at the end of the 1959–60 season.

Taylor fared no better in the lower division, and resigned in March 1961, to be replaced by Revie.

== 1961–74 Don Revie: "The Glory Days" ==
Honours Won: First Division Championship (1968–69, 1973–74), FA Cup (1971–72), Football League Cup (1967–68), Inter-Cities Fairs Cup (1967–68, 1970–71), Charity Shield (1969–70), Second Division Championship (1963–64)

Runners Up: First Division (1964–65, 1965–66, 1969–70, 1970–71, 1971–72), FA Cup (1964–65, 1969–70, 1972–73), Inter-Cities Fairs Cup (1966–67), European Cup Winners Cup (1972–73)

Semi-Finalists: FA Cup (1966–67, 1967–68), Inter-Cities Fairs Cup (1965–66), European Cup (1969–70)

Under Revie, Leeds enjoyed their most successful period, yet his stewardship started in adverse conditions; the club was in financial difficulty, and in the 1961–62 season only a win in the final game of the season saved the club from relegation to the Third Division.

Revie immediately made radical changes to the club; adopting the all white colours of Real Madrid, and concentrating the club policy on scouting and developing youth talent, rather than simply buying older players. He appointed experienced coaches like Les Cocker, Maurice Lindley and Syd Owen, and implemented radical techniques like forming a family atmosphere around the club. Revie took on more revolutionary techniques, his pre-match preparation was meticulous for its day, his staff prepared highly detailed dossiers on the opposition before every match and pioneered a highly detailed approach to the way opposing teams could be analysed. Coaches like Les Cocker were also responsible for developing high fitness levels in the Leeds players, using diets and rigorous, military style training programs. Revie forged a completely new team around a crop of outstanding youth talents, including Norman Hunter, Paul Reaney, Peter Lorimer, Eddie Gray, Billy Bremner, Paul Madeley, Albert Johanneson, Mick Bates and these were backed up by more experienced heads Jack Charlton, and veteran Scottish international central midfielder Bobby Collins. Revie also made a shrewd purchase in acquiring former Busby Babe winger John Giles from Manchester United, who Leeds' coaching staff would mould into one of the most influential central midfielders of the game. In 1964 this new team won promotion once more to the First Division.

Leeds made an immediate impact; they began the season with a scintillating 4–2 victory over defending league champions Liverpool, which would set the tone for the rest of the season. Revie's young side chased an improbable league and cup double finishing the 1964–65 season as runners up only to Busby's Manchester United, losing the title on goal average. They turned the tables on Manchester United in the FA cup semi-final replay, reaching the FA Cup Final where they were beaten 2–1 by Liverpool in a dour game, best remembered for the appearance of Albert Johanneson, the first black player to play in an FA Cup final.

The 1965–66 season saw Leeds consolidate their place in the First Division, finishing as runners up in the league again, and progressing through to the semifinals of the Inter-Cities Fairs Cup with victories over sides such as Valencia and Torino.

The 1966–67 season saw Leeds finish 4th in the league, as well as reaching the FA Cup Semi-finals and making an early exit from the League Cup. In addition, their European campaign ended as beaten finalists in the Inter-Cities Fairs Cup, losing 2–0 to Dinamo Zagreb.

Leeds spent the 1967–68 season chasing four trophies; leading the title race for much of the season, although eventually losing out to Manchester City and finishing fourth. Revie's men were also beaten semi-finalists in the FA Cup, although they did find their first domestic and European successes, completing a League Cup and Fairs Cup double. Terry Cooper's goal securing a tense League Cup final victory against Arsenal, and a Mick Jones goal secured the Fairs cup victory over the veteran Hungarian side Ferencváros. Leeds were the first British team to win the trophy.

Leeds won the First Division Championship for the first time in the 1968–69 season; they lost only two league games, and were unbeaten at home which was the best record in the 20th century. The price of such consistency in the league was reflected in poor cup runs, as Leeds exited the FA cup, and League cup in the early stages, although reached the quarterfinal of the Fairs Cup, after victories over Standard Liege, Napoli and Hannover. During this season Leeds broke the following top flight records: Most points (67), Most home points (39), Most wins (27), Most home wins (18), Fewest defeats (2), Only 26 goals conceded.

At the beginning of the 1969–70 season Don Revie completed the signing of Allan Clarke from Leicester City, in the hope of trying to win all three of the major competitions – the League, the FA Cup and the European Cup. In the end, they won none of them – in the League, Leeds were runners up to Everton, and in the European Cup they went out in the semifinals to Celtic. Leeds also reached the FA Cup final and, despite a memorable performance from Eddie Gray, lost to Chelsea after a replay. Revie's Leeds were victims of their own success; FA rules at the time stipulated that a squad of only 20 players could be used, and as a consequence some of the Leeds players took part in 62 competitive games that season. Additionally, FA rules only allowed the use of one substitute, and even then only in case of injury. Other factors, such as fixture congestion and the FA's insistence that Leeds play 9 games in 22 days (the 1969–70 season was foreshortened by England's early departure to Mexico to defend the World Cup) meant that Revie was often forced to field tired players. Geoffrey Green of the Times wrote: "It has been a strenuous slog, greatly pressurised by the loss of a month because of the demands of Mexican acclimatisation for England's players in the World Cup. None have suffered more than Leeds United's players ... At the beginning of March, Leeds looked capable of winning everything and anything, including the General Election. At that time they seemed unbeatable, but in the end a condensed programme of highly competitive fixtures overwhelmed them. Should it be any consolation to them, Leeds have now probably won something more in defeat as good losers than they would have done in many hours of victorious celebrating – universal public sympathy."

At the end of the season, Leeds won only the Charity Shield, although consolation came in the form of Manager of the Year and Player of the Year awards for Revie and Bremner respectively.

In the 1970–71 season Leeds were runners up in the league again, in controversial circumstances. With four games to play, Leeds were two points clear at the top of the league. Whilst playing West Bromwich Albion, Leeds had a Mick Jones goal dissalowed and later in the game a Leeds pass was intercepted by West Bromwich player Tony Brown. Brown paused, as his teammate Colin Suggett was running back from an offside position – the linesman flagged for offside, and the majority of players stopped when they saw that the flag was raised. Referee Ray Tinkler overruled the linesman, allowing Brown to play the ball to Jeff Astle, who scored what proved to be the winning goal. Both Revie and the Leeds fans were so enraged at the decision that they invaded the pitch to protest, and consequently the FA banned Leeds from playing their first five home games of the following season at home. Despite winning all their remaining games (including a 1–0 victory over rivals Arsenal) Leeds lost the title to Arsenal by 1 point, in doing so accumulating a record number of points for second place, 12 points ahead of third placed Tottenham. In addition, Leeds went out of the FA Cup in the 5th round in a shock 3–2 defeat by Colchester, who were in the Fourth Division at the time. There was consolation in Europe though; Leeds won the Fairs Cup for a second time, beating Juventus over two legs, with Mick Bates, Paul Madeley and Allan Clarke scoring the crucial goals.

The Fairs Cup was replaced with the UEFA Cup, and at the beginning of the next season Leeds were requested to contest a play-off match with Barcelona at the Camp Nou to decide who would keep the Fairs Cup permanently; Revie wishing to concentrate on the domestic league, and sent a side containing several youth players. Leeds lost the match 2–1.

As a result of the pitch invasion against West Bromwich Albion, Leeds were banned from playing their first five home games of the 1971–72 season at home, and only managed to pick up 2 points from those games. However, they still managed to mount a challenge for the Double; an Allan Clarke goal was enough as Leeds beat Arsenal 1–0 in the FA Cup Final, but once again heavy fixture congestion meant that Leeds had to play three crucial games within the space of one week; an away match against Chelsea in the league three days before the FA cup final and they had to play their final league game less than two days after the final, which was away to Wolves. Leeds only had to draw this game to win the title, but they were beaten. The league went to Derby County, again by 1 point. Eric Todd of the Guardian wrote on the situation in the week prior to these games: "If Leeds fail to win either the Cup or the League title they need not blame loss of form. They must blame the system. And if Leeds cannot field a full strength side against Arsenal at Wembley, the crowd can blame the Football League and Chelsea who have decided that their jaunt to the West Indies, or wherever it is, is more important than trying to help Leeds prepare properly for crucial football matches." In later years controversy surrounding the Wolves game would develop into a match-fixing scandal, with accusations directed towards Leeds United captain Billy Bremner. However Bremner would clear his name of these allegations in court, with evidence given for Bremner by Wolves's captain and forward Derek Dougan, who scored the winning goal in the match at Molineux.

Leeds finished 3rd in the league during the 1972–73 season, never sustaining a convincing title challenge, but they again mounted impressive cup runs domestically and in Europe reaching two finals. However, in space of two dramatic weeks, Leeds would be the victims of one of the biggest giant killings in football history and losers of one of the most controversial European finals. In the 1973 FA Cup Final, a full strength Leeds side was beaten 1–0 by second division Sunderland, and two weeks later a weakened Leeds United side were beaten 1–0 by A.C. Milan in the bad tempered 1973 European Cup Winners' Cup Final. Leeds went into the game missing Bremner, Giles, and Clarke, and also under a cloud of press speculation surrounding Revie, who had been strongly linked with the Everton managers post. This speculation and Revie's revelation one hour before the match, that he had decided to accept the job, created a despressed atmosphere inside the Leeds dressing room, but the remaining players determined they were going to win the trophy as a tribute to their seemingly departing manager. AC Milan opened the scoring in the first few minutes and the rest of the match would be dominated by dubious refereeing decisions; numerous fouls against Leeds were ignored by the referee Christos Michas and the aggravation eventually boiled over in the closing stages, with Norman Hunter being sent off for retaliation as Leeds pushed for an equaliser. Leeds also had two penalty appeals – a handball and a trip on forward Mick Jones inside the Milan penalty area – ignored by the referee. The match ended with missiles being thrown at the Milan players and the match officials by a Greek crowd who had begun the match as neutral observers, but had ended it sympathising with the Leeds players, who gave a lap of honour around the stadium to rapturous applause. The referee Christos Michas was subsequently banned from refereeing for life by UEFA; however despite appeals from Leeds United no replay was awarded by UEFA and AC Milan were never penalised.

The shock of losing to Sunderland and the manner of defeat in Greece caused Revie to turn down the Everton managers job, and inspired his team to attempt to go through the following league season unbeaten. In Revie's final season in charge, Leeds won the 1973–74 title going 29 matches unbeaten, eventually losing away to Stoke. This was still a record unbeaten start to a league campaign in the 20th century, and not bettered until Arsenal's 2003–04 campaign. In total Leeds lost just 4 league games and remained in first place for almost the entire campaign. At the end of the season Don Revie left to become England national manager.

In his thirteen years in charge, Revie guided Leeds to two Football League First Division titles, one FA Cup, one League Cup, two Inter-Cities Fairs Cups, one Football League Second Division title and one Charity Shield. He also guided them to three more FA Cup Finals, two more FA Cup Semi-finals, one more Inter-Cities Fairs Cup Final and one Inter-Cities Fairs Cup Semi-final, one European Cup Winners' Cup Final and one European Cup Semi-final. The team also finished second in the Football League First Division five times, third once and fourth twice.

Leeds' reputation was built on strong organisation, professionalism, physical robustness (at a time when football was more physical than it is today), as well as free flowing attacking wing play and patient, possession based football. The team was built around a core of technically adept, intelligent and versatile players, who were willing to play in multiple positions and indeed could interchange positions and roles around the pitch. Most of Revie's team went on to become internationals; in 1970 the squad contained 17 full internationals. This was at a time when squads never had more than 20 players, when players from outside the British Isles were rare in English football, and international players correspondingly more rare. Two of Revie's players would feature in England's 1966 World Cup winning squad, with Jack Charlton playing a pivotal role at the heart of defence, a further four Leeds players would feature in England's 1970 World Cup squad (two more missed out through injury and fatigue), and five Leeds players featured in Scotland's 1974 World Cup squad. In the early 1970s the Leeds team could boast the captain of Ireland, John Giles, the captain of Scotland, Billy Bremner and the captain of Wales, Terry Yorath. Leeds would also loan their first team coach Les Cocker to the England national team throughout this period; as one of the first holders of an FA certificate in coaching, he would combine his responsibilities to Leeds with that of the national team and play a pivotal role to the success of England in the 1966 world cup as team trainer.

In a survey of leading football writers, historians and academics by Total Sport magazine, Revie's Leeds United were voted as one of the fifty greatest football teams of all time. In a 1973 episode of the Big Match, Manchester City manager Malcolm Allison rated Leeds as the greatest British club side of all time, stating; "they play the best football I've seen from any English side ever and probably comparable to some of the great teams that I have seen like Hungary".

== 1974 Brian Clough: 44 days of turmoil ==
Runners Up: Charity Shield (1974–75)

Don Revie had recommended Johnny Giles as his replacement; however, the Leeds board instead appointed one of England's most successful and outspoken managers, Brian Clough, who had guided Derby County to the league championship in 1972. However, Clough arrived without his key assistant Peter Taylor, who was supposed to be part of the deal agreed by Leeds chairman Manny Cussins, but instead decided to remain at Brighton. Clough was an outspoken critic of Revie and his team; in addition, his management style was in complete contrast to Revie's close relationship with his players and his methodical attention to detail.

At Clough's first team talk, he reportedly told the Leeds players to throw their medals away, as they had won them by cheating. He also antagonised several senior players, including captain Billy Bremner and Norman Hunter, and reportedly told the injury-prone Eddie Gray that if he had been a horse, he would have been shot years ago. Clough purchased players who he felt could turn the dressing room such as John O'Hare and John McGovern from Derby County, and thrust them into the team ahead of the established players who were lukewarm to his appointment. Clough's first match in charge was the 1974 FA Charity Shield against Liverpool at Wembley Stadium; Leeds lost on penalties after a 1–1 draw, but the match is best remembered for Bremner and Kevin Keegan being sent off for fighting. The FA imposed an 11 match ban on Bremner. Deprived of his captain, Clough's tenure was further hampered by injuries to numerous first team players. Leeds' start to the league campaign was poor, with just one victory and two draws from his first six games, leaving the club 19th in the First Division.

Unnerved by the poor results, the directors called an extraordinary meeting to gauge the players' feelings about the new manager and his methods. Some players, such as Allan Clarke and Johnny Giles, recognised the need to rebuild Revie's ageing side, and thought Clough should be given more time. Others – notably Paul Madeley – felt differently, and said so during the meeting. Shortly after, an emergency board meeting was held, and in September 1974 Clough was sacked after only 44 days in charge. Clough went on to greater things with Nottingham Forest; of his signings for Leeds, only Duncan McKenzie flourished at the club.

== 1974–78 Jimmy Armfield: rebuilding Revie's team ==
Runners Up: European Cup (1974–75)

Semi-Finalists: FA Cup (1976–77), League Cup (1977–78)

Clough was replaced in October 1974 by former England captain Jimmy Armfield, who stabilised the club – Leeds finished 9th in the league – and Revie's old team made one last swansong in the European Cup, reaching the final of the competition after defeating Spanish champions Barcelona over two legs, a team captained by Johan Cruyff. However Leeds would lose another European final in controversial circumstances, going down 2–0 to defending European champions Bayern Munich. Leeds had dominated the match with Bayern taking the defensive from the outset; in the 60th minute Peter Lorimer had a seemingly decisive goal disallowed due to a dubious offside decision given against captain Billy Bremner. This came after both the linesman and referee had initially signalled a goal. The referee Michel Kitabdjian also turned down two Leeds claims for penalties, firstly when Franz Beckenbauer handled the ball inside the penalty area, and then when the Bayern Munich captain tripped Allan Clarke in the box after going through on goal. In response to these decisions, frustrated Leeds fans ripped out seats at the Parc des Princes stadium and rioted, which resulted in Leeds receiving a three-year ban from European football. Kitabdjian never officiated in Europe again.

Assisted by Don Howe, Armfield was responsible for rebuilding Don Revie's ageing side, a task which he achieved with some success. He retained a core set of players – Paul Madeley, Eddie Gray, Trevor Cherry, Frank Gray, Terry Yorath, Gordon McQueen and Joe Jordan – and complemented them with purchases such as Tony Currie, Arthur Graham and Brian Flynn. In the four years under Armfield, Leeds played in a European Cup Final, qualified for the UEFA cup, reached FA and League Cup semi-finals, and never finished outside of the top ten. However, the board was impatient for greater success and in July 1978 dismissed him, replacing him with Celtic manager Jock Stein.

== 1978–82 Stein, Adamson and Clarke: decline and relegation ==
Semi-finalists: League Cup (1978–79)

Stein remained as Leeds manager for just 44 days before taking up an invitation to manage the Scottish national team. In October 1978 the board turned to Jimmy Adamson, a long-time manager at Burnley, who took Leeds back into Europe and reached a League Cup semi-final in his first season in charge. However, some wretched sales in the transfer market – notably Tony Currie and Frank Gray – caused a rapid decline in Leeds' fortunes, with the team winning just four of their first seventeen league games during the 1979–80 season. With the fans calling for him to be dismissed, Adamson resigned in September 1980.

Adamson was replaced by former Leeds and England star Allan Clarke. Clarke shored up the defence, ensuring that Leeds survived the 1980–81 season, but in the first game of the 1981–82 season Leeds lost 5–1 to Swansea City, and the team never seemed to recover. The previously watertight defence started to ship goals, and the team seemed unable to score. Clarke broke the club's transfer record when he purchased Peter Barnes for an initial £750,000, but his impact was slight – between 12 December 1981 and 6 April 1982, the team scored just five goals in fourteen league games. Clarke was unable to find a reliable striker until Frank Worthington was recruited in March 1982. Leeds were relegated at the end of the 1981–82 season; Clarke was sacked and replaced by former teammate Eddie Gray.

It was during this time that Leeds United fans gained an unwanted reputation across the country which tarnished the club's names. Incidents of football hooliganism were rife, and there were regular instances of British National Front members and supporters peddling their literature to spectators on their way in and out of the stadium.

== 1982–88 Gray and Bremner: seeking promotion ==
Runners-up: Second Division play-off final (1986–87)

Semi-Finalists: FA Cup (1986–87)

Clarke's spending had left Leeds in a precarious financial situation, and Gray was forced to concentrate on youth development to rebuild the team. Gray had no money to spend on team building, and those players he developed were often sold off as well. Young players to emerge during this period included Neil Aspin, Denis Irwin, John Sheridan, Scott Sellars and Bob Taylor – who all enjoyed considerable success at other clubs after leaving Leeds. The 1984–85 season saw Leeds take the promotion battle to the final game, but lost 1–0 away to Birmingham City. However, that game will be remembered for all the wrong reasons by both clubs due to a high-profile hooliganism incident at St Andrew's stadium. Leeds fans rioted at the game, causing a wall to collapse and crushing a 15-year-old boy to death. 96 policemen were injured, hundreds of thousands of pounds worth of damage was caused by vandalism and graffiti, and the collapsed wall also crushed several parked motor vehicles beyond repair.

However, Leeds started the 1985–86 badly and relegation to the Third Division became a real possibility, causing Gray to be sacked in favour of another Revie teammate, former Leeds and Scotland captain Billy Bremner. Bremner carried on where Gray had left off, but found it just as difficult to achieve promotion, though he did bring the club close to success. Under Bremner, the club were defeated 2–1 in the 1987 play-off final, after extra time, against Charlton Athletic and, in the same year, were beaten 3–2 (after extra-time) in the FA Cup semi-final, losing to eventual winners Coventry City. In October 1988, with the team standing at 21st position in the Second Division, Bremner was fired to make way for Howard Wilkinson.

== 1988–96 Howard Wilkinson: re-emergence ==
Honours Won: First Division Championship (1991–92), Second Division Championship (1989–90), Charity Shield (1992–93)

Runners Up: Football League Cup (1995–96)

Wilkinson set about building a team capable of promotion. Key acquisitions included Gordon Strachan, Vinnie Jones, Mel Sterland, Lee Chapman and Chris Fairclough. He also began to bring players through from the youth team, including David Batty (actually a product of the Bremner era) and Gary Speed. In the 1989–90 season Leeds finally won promotion back to the First Division after an absence of eight years. Leeds were promoted as Second Division Champions.

Wilkinson continued to rebuild the team, and among his 1990 signings were the club's first million-pound signings - goalkeeper John Lukic and midfielder Gary McAllister. The club finished the 1990–91 season in fourth place in the First Division, also reaching the semifinals of the League Cup, and the board continued to make money available to Wilkinson, allowing the signings of Tony Dorigo, Steve Hodge and Rod Wallace in 1991.

The following season saw Leeds pip Manchester United to the First Division championship, the last before it was rebranded as the Premier League. In January 1992, Wilkinson brought one of the club's first foreign signings to Elland Road - French striker Eric Cantona. By this stage, Leeds were competing with Manchester United in what was effectively a two-horse race for the league title. The title was secured in the penultimate game of the season, when Leeds defeated Sheffield United 3–2 and Manchester United lost to Liverpool. Wilkinson's side boasted arguably the finest midfield in the League in the form of Strachan, Batty, McAllister and Speed.

The 1992–93 season started promisingly, with Leeds beating Liverpool 4–3 in the Charity Shield. Wilkinson had set his sights on winning the UEFA Champions League but progress was halted by Rangers, who beat Leeds in both legs of a clash labelled the "Battle of Britain". Controversially, Eric Cantona was sold to rivals Manchester United for £1.2 million in November 1992, having already being dropped from the time despite being the top scorer, and Leeds seemed incapable of any consistency – the team failed to win an away game all season, becoming the only defending League champions ever to achieve this dubious record. Leeds eventually finished 17th in the League – three places above relegation.

The following 1993–94 season saw a much improved and reshaped Leeds side finish 5th in League. The subsequent 1994–95 season again saw Leeds finish 5th, this time qualifying for the UEFA Cup. The previously erratic defence was shored up by Lucas Radebe, who proved to be an astute purchase, as did striker Tony Yeboah. Unfortunately Wilkinson also made a number of suspect signings, notably Carlton Palmer for £2.6million and later Tomas Brolin for £4.5million. Brolin had arrived at Elland Road in October 1995 as one of the most highly rated forwards in Europe, but his form for Leeds was disappointing and he made his last appearance for the club barely six months later, although he lingered on the payroll for nearly two years afterwards before finally leaving on a free transfer.

Wilkinson's mid 1990s team failed to live up to expectations, and the 1995–96 season saw Leeds finish in 13th position. Leeds did reach the League Cup final, but were beaten 3–0 by Aston Villa in a disappointing performance.

Despite the arrival of Nigel Martyn and Lee Bowyer, Leeds made a slow start to the 1996–97 season, and after a 4–0 home defeat by Manchester United, Wilkinson had his contract terminated. Under Wilkinson Leeds won the First Division Championship, the Second Division Championship, the Charity Shield and reached the League Cup Final. Howard Wilkinson remains the second most successful manager of the club behind Don Revie, and the only other manager to guide the club to a major trophy.

== 1996–98 George Graham: Rejuvenation ==
Leeds controversially appointed George Graham as Howard Wilkinson's successor; Graham had recently finished a 12-month ban from football for accepting illegal payments at his former club Arsenal. When Graham arrived, he stepped into a club where the players' morale was low; he started work immediately by sorting out the team's defence and Leeds became "bore draw" specialists, finishing the 1996–97 season in 11th place. He made some astute purchases, notably Jimmy Floyd Hasselbaink and Bruno Ribeiro, and also introduced Australian youngster Harry Kewell from the youth team. Under Graham, Leeds finished the 1997–98 season in 5th place, qualifying for the following season's UEFA Cup. However, within a few weeks of the 1998–99 season, Graham left Leeds to manage Tottenham Hotspur.

== 1998–2002 David O'Leary: living the dream ==
Semi-Finalists: UEFA Cup (1999–2000), UEFA Champions League (2000–01)

The Leeds board wanted Martin O'Neill to take the job; however pressure from Leicester City fans meant O'Neill stayed on as their manager. Leeds opted for David O'Leary, George Graham's assistant manager.

O'Leary introduced promising youngsters like Jonathan Woodgate, Alan Smith and Stephen McPhail to complement the likes of Harry Kewell and Ian Harte, who were already established in the first team. Leeds finished the 1998–99 season in 4th place, qualifying for the UEFA Cup once again.

The following 1999–2000 season saw a superb run in the UEFA Cup complemented by good form in the league, with Leeds finishing 3rd place and qualifying for the UEFA Champions League.

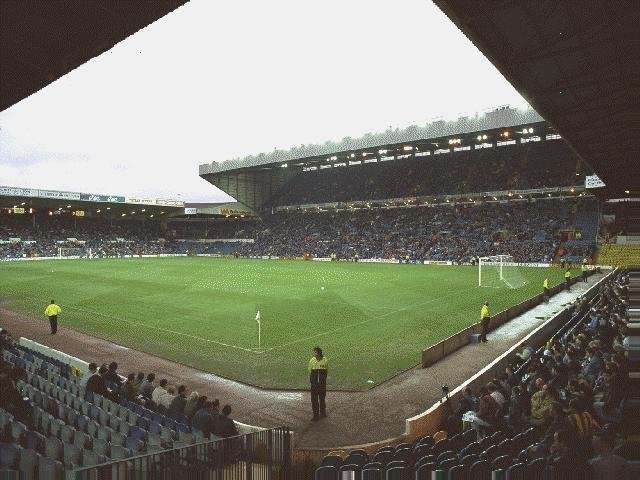
Leeds United's home ground, Elland Road

Unfortunately, Leeds' image was tarnished by an incident in January 2000 involving Jonathan Woodgate and Lee Bowyer, which left an Asian student in hospital with severe injuries. The trial of Bowyer and Woodgate took nearly two years to resolve before the start-stop court case came to a close (a prejudicial Sunday Mirror article in 2001 caused the original trial to collapse and a re-trial was scheduled several months later). Bowyer was cleared, and Woodgate convicted of affray and sentenced to community service. Bowyer played some of the finest football of his career during the trial and would often drive straight from court to play for Leeds; however, Woodgate's form deteriorated, and he had to sit out games due to pressure.

In the UEFA Cup Leeds reached their first European semi-final in 25 years, and were paired against Turkish champions Galatasaray. The first leg of the semifinal was played in Istanbul, with Leeds losing the game 2–0. However, the result was overshadowed by the death of two Leeds United fans, Christopher Loftus and Kevin Speight, who were stabbed to death in rioting the night before the game. Leeds were only able to draw the return leg at Elland Road and went out of the competition. A minute's silence is held every year at the match closest to the anniversary of the incident to remember Christopher Loftus and Kevin Speight.

The 2000–01 season saw Leeds enjoy a spectacular run in the Champions League, playing the likes of Barcelona, Real Madrid, Lazio and AC Milan. They eventually lost in the semifinals to Valencia. Leeds could only finish in 4th place in the league, narrowly missing on qualification for the Champions League.

The 2001–02 season saw continued investment; Robbie Fowler and Seth Johnson signed for a combined fee of around £20 million. Leeds began the season brightly, losing just two of their opening 21 matches, and they topped the table on New Year's Day 2002. However, they then failed to win a league match for two months, a run which included a dismal 4–0 home defeat to Liverpool, and were knocked out of the FA Cup by Second Division Cardiff City. Leeds ultimately finished 5th, thus missing out on qualification for the UEFA Champions League. O'Leary was sacked at the end of the season; the reasons given were that despite heavy investment in the squad, Leeds had failed to qualify for the Champions League for two consecutive seasons, and there were also reports that O'Leary had lost the confidence of some of the players. In four seasons as manager, O'Leary had guided Leeds to four consecutive top five finishes and two European semi-finals.

Although the general public were unaware, chairman Peter Ridsdale had taken out large loans against the prospect of gate receipts from Champions League games. As Leeds had failed to qualify for the competition, there was simply not enough money coming in to repay the debt. The first indication that the club was in financial trouble was the sale of Rio Ferdinand to Manchester United for £30 million, a world record for a defender. O'Leary and Ridsdale publicly fell out over the sale.

== 2002–04 Venables, Reid and Gray: another decline ==
On 8 July 2002, former England and Tottenham coach Terry Venables was unveiled as O'Leary's successor. Martin O'Neill and Steve McClaren had also been linked with the job. Despite Venables being confident of keeping Ferdinand, the England defender was sold to Manchester United in a record £30 million deal. Ferdinand's departure was soon followed by that of striker Robbie Keane, who joined Tottenham for £7 million on transfer deadline day in August. Bowyer was also set to leave, but a proposed £9 million move to Liverpool fell through at the last moment. The only new arrivals in the summer were Nicky Barmby, a £2.5 million signing from Liverpool, and Paul Okon, a free transfer from Watford. Things began promisingly under Venables; Leeds won four of their opening six Premier League games, including a 1–0 win over old rivals Manchester United, and they briefly topped the table. Thereafter, however, results were poor and the team drifted into mid-table, at one point as low as 16th.

Reports of the club's precarious financial position continued to circulate, and in the January 2003 transfer window, more key players departed: Robbie Fowler, Olivier Dacourt, Lee Bowyer and Jonathan Woodgate were sold to repay the debt, and to reduce an unsustainable wage bill. The sale of Woodgate particularly upset Venables, who had been promised by Ridsdale that the player would not be sold. Tensions mounted between the pair, eventually resulting in the sacking of Venables, who was replaced by Peter Reid. By now Leeds were in danger of relegation, but Reid saved Leeds from the drop with a 3–2 win away to Arsenal in the penultimate game of the season – a result which won the title for rivals Manchester United.

In the meantime, Peter Ridsdale resigned from the Leeds board and was replaced by Professor John McKenzie, who had to try to turn around a club with debts in excess of £100 million. Leeds reported a British record loss of £49.5 million in October 2003, which on-top of their already existing £78 million debt set the club's total debt at £127.5 million.

During summer 2003 Harry Kewell – who was nearing the end of his contract – joined Liverpool for £5 million; controversially, Leeds received just £3 million for the player, while £2 million went to Kewell's manager Bernie Mandic.

An unsuccessful start to the 2003–04 season saw Leeds collect just 8 points from the club's first 12 Premiership fixtures, and after a 6–1 defeat at Portsmouth Reid was dismissed. Former manager Eddie Gray was appointed as caretaker manager until the end of the season.

Gray continued the trend of recent years in rebuilding with young players, including James Milner and Aaron Lennon. A period of serious financial difficulty resulted in takeover offers, including a £60 million bid by Ugandan property tycoon Michael Ezra, but the team was eventually sold in early 2004 to a consortium led by new chairman Gerald Krasner. The team continued to struggle on the field, and Leeds were relegated to the Championship at the end of the 2003–04 season. Following confirmation of the club's relegation, Gray's reign as caretaker manager was terminated. His former assistant, Kevin Blackwell, was appointed caretaker manager for the final match of the season, and afterwards as permanent manager.

At the end of the season, other members of the team – Paul Robinson, Dominic Matteo, Mark Viduka and Alan Smith – were transferred, and even Milner, whom Leeds had been intent on keeping, had to be sold. In their place Leeds began signing players prepared to accept lower wages. The club were eventually forced to sell both their training ground, for £4.2m, and their Elland Road stadium in autumn 2004.

== 2004–07 Blackwell and Wise: play-off final heartbreak and relegation to League One ==
Runners-up: Championship play-off final (2005—06)

On 21 January 2005, Krasner announced the sale of a 50% stake to Ken Bates for £10m and Bates became the club's new chairman, replacing Krasner. This investment effectively saved Leeds United from going into administration. Bates had previously headed three other league football clubs, most famously Leeds' old rivals Chelsea.

Blackwell was forced to sell most of the remaining players, including Aaron Lennon; somehow he managed to build a team using loan players and experienced professionals nearing the end of their careers. Despite a promising opening day win against Derby County, Leeds's form at the start of the 2004–05 Coca-Cola Championship was little better than in the previous season, and they spent the first half of the campaign looking in serious danger of a second successive relegation. Their form gradually picked up after the club was taken over by Bates and Leeds finished in a relatively safe 14th place.

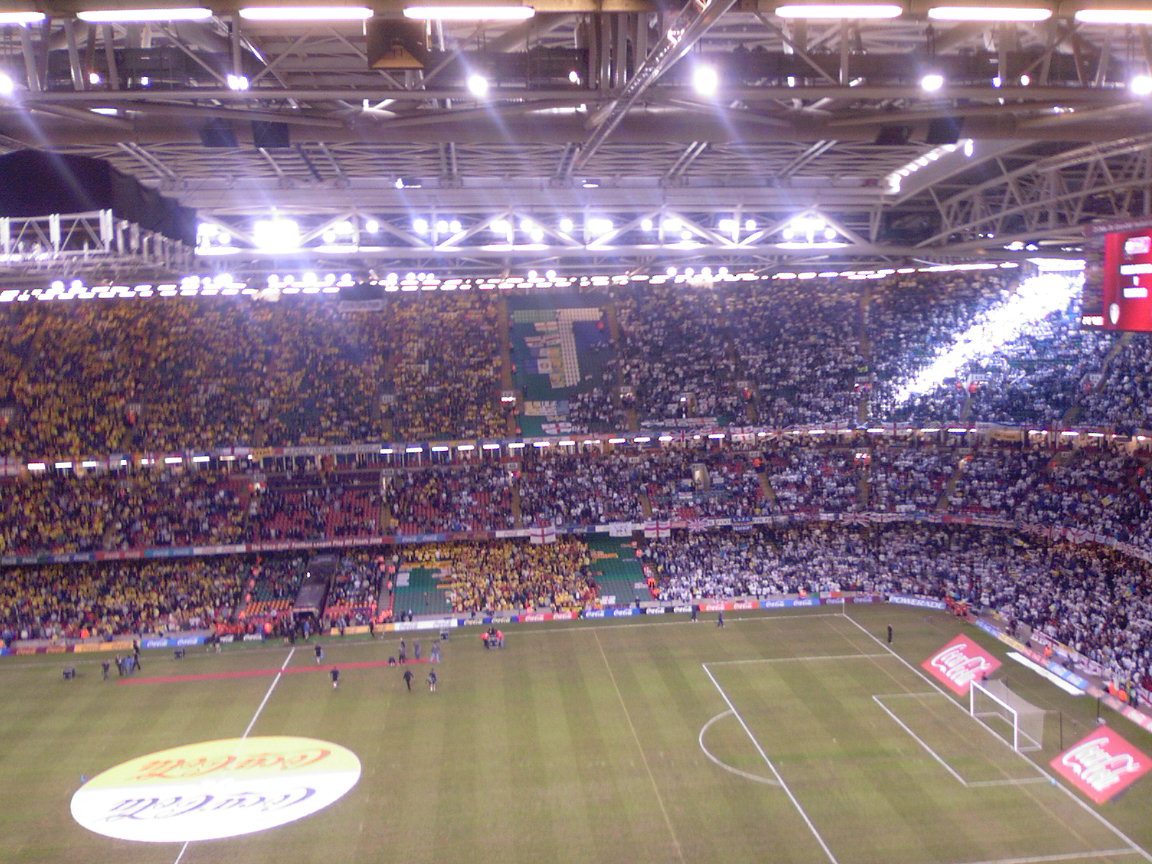
Championship Play-off final 2006 (Leeds vs Watford).

With new players brought in over the summer, the club's goal during the 2005–06 season was promotion. Blackwell's shrewd tactics away from Elland Road and attacking style at home proved highly effective, and by the end of February he had guided Leeds to 3rd place in the Championship. However, from that point onwards Leeds slumped, gaining just 4 points from a possible 18, and eventually had to settle for a play-off place. In the first round of the playoffs against Preston North End, Leeds drew 1–1 at Elland Road, but then won the return leg 2–0 to advance to the Play-off final. The playoff final was played on 21 May 2006 at the Millennium Stadium in Cardiff, though in a dismal performance, Leeds crashed to a 3–0 final defeat to Watford. While some fans predicted that Leeds would go one better and finally return to the Premier League the following year, others were concerned by the fact that with the exception of the bottom four teams, Leeds's form going into the play-offs was the worst of any team in the Championship, their only two wins in the final months of the campaign being the play-off victory against Preston and a narrow 1–0 victory against relegated Crewe Alexandra.

On 10 September 2006, Kevin Blackwell announced that within a year the club would be debt free. Just over 2 years before, Leeds United had been £121 million in debt.

On 20 September 2006, after a poor start to the season, Kevin Blackwell's contract was terminated. John Carver was appointed as caretaker manager, but after winning his first match against Birmingham City, the club went on a run of five straight defeats with 17 goals conceded before Carver was dismissed after just three weeks in charge that saw Leeds crash to the foot of the Championship table. From this point, despite occasional improvements in form, Leeds would never escape the relegation zone. David Geddis took over the responsibilities for the League Cup match against Southend United. Dennis Wise eventually took charge on 25 October 2006. It was announced on 20 November 2006 that Kevin Blackwell was suing the club for wrongful dismissal after it was confirmed he was sacked for gross misconduct, on the grounds of "negative comments made in the press about the club's finances".

Wise started by improving the fitness of the side, and by bringing in a number of loan players, notably Alan Thompson. Unfortunately, he was unable to bring any consistency to the side (not helped by injuries to Thompson and fellow new signing Tore André Flo after playing just 3 and 2 games respectively; Flo did not play again that season), and by May 2007 Leeds were relegated from the Championship after entering voluntary administration.

== 2007: Administration ==
Leeds entered voluntary Administration on 4 May 2007, thus incurring a 10-point deduction which confirmed the club's relegation to League One. Administration had been predicted for some time, due to crippling debts created during Peter Ridsdale's chairmanship. For his part, Ridsdale denied any of the current situation was his fault, only days after having admitted it was a mistake to allow David O'Leary to spend so lavishly on players. Ken Bates, however, blamed Leeds financial situation firmly on Ridsdale and his board. KPMG were appointed as administrators and within minutes of entering administration sold the club to Leeds United Football Club Limited, owned by Ken Bates, Shaun Harvey and Mark Taylor. On 1 June 2007 75.20% of the creditors voted in favour of Ken Bates' bid. With just minutes remaining of the 28-day period during which creditors could challenge the buyback by Ken Bates, HM Revenue & Customs lodged a formal challenge, and the club was put up for sale again. After due deliberation, on 11 July 2007 KPMG revealed that once again they had chosen Ken Bates' bid.

During the weekend of 21 July 2007, Leeds United fans decorated the statue of Billy Bremner outside the Elland Road stadium with flowers, Leeds United shirts and scarves, and notes bearing messages of support for their team, as uncertainty over the future of the club grew amid legal disputes between owners, football authorities, administrators and HMRC. Certain sections of the press predicted (or even called for) Leeds's expulsion from the Football League, but this was considered a difficult matter for the League, since there had never been any precedent for expelling a club outside of the bottom division.

The league eventually sanctioned the sale to Bates without the club going through a CVA under the "exceptional circumstances rule", but imposed a 15-point deduction due to Leeds not following football league rules on clubs exiting administration. On 31 August 2007 HMRC decided not to pursue their legal challenge any further, accepting Bates' final offer.

== 2007–2010, Wise, McAllister and Grayson: the third tier ==
Runners-up: League One Play Off Final (2007–08)

Semi-Finalists: League One Play Off Semi-Final (2008–09)

Promotion From League One (2009–10)

After waiting most of the summer for the league-imposed transfer embargo to be lifted, Leeds were eventually allowed to sign players on 7 August 2007. They immediately set about re-signing players whose loan or permanent contracts had expired during the summer including the experienced Alan Thompson, Tore André Flo and Casper Ankergren. Some new faces were also brought in such as the previous England under-21 star David Prutton. Thompson was awarded the captain's arm-band due to his previous high-level experience. Leeds won their first match in the third tier 2–1 away at Tranmere Rovers with a goal from Tresor Kandol sealing the victory in the 89th minute, and won their next six league games to equal the club's best ever start to a season, last achieved 34 years ago in the 1973–74 season). In recognition of the outstanding start to the season, Wise was named as League One's Manager of the Month for August and September 2007. However, after guiding Leeds to the play-off places despite the 15-point deduction, Wise controversially quit the club to take up a position in Kevin Keegan's new set-up at Newcastle United.

The following day former club captain Gary McAllister, who had been captain the last time Leeds won the League Championship, was appointed as the club's new manager with Steve Staunton his assistant. After the New Year, Leeds's form began to slump badly, the team going seven games without a win at one stage, and by the end of March the team had fallen to mid-table, and their promotion hopes looked to be in tatters. However, an excellent run of seven wins from their last eight games saw them secure fifth place and a play-off spot; without the well-publicised points deduction they would have finished second and earned automatic promotion. The deduction was heavily appealed, but this ultimately failed on 1 May 2008 when an independent arbitration panel ruled that the Football League were right to give Leeds this deduction.

Victory over Gillingham on the final day of the season saw Leeds finish fifth in the final table and book themselves a play-off semi-final tie with Carlisle United. After losing 2–1 with a poor performance in the first leg at Elland Road, Leeds beat Carlisle 2–0 at Brunton Park to book their first appearance at Wembley in 12 years, and their first ever appearance at the new Wembley Stadium. Leeds lost the Play-off Final 1–0 to Doncaster Rovers.

Leeds seemed unable to maintain any consistency; they started the 2008/09 season well, but lost momentum and a series of poor performances saw them slip out of the play-off positions. In the cups, Leeds were beaten in Johnston's Paint Trophy by Rotherham, and struggled to the quarterfinals of the League Cup, where they were beaten 2–1 by Derby. McAllister was sacked on 21 December following a run of 6 defeats in a row, including an embarrassing defeat to non-league Histon in the FA Cup, and replaced by Blackpool manager Simon Grayson. Blackpool subsequently reported Leeds United to the Football League, claiming that they rejected five approaches from Leeds to talk to Grayson, and that they had not accepted Grayson's resignation.

Once Grayson established himself, the club began to turn around its performances and following a defeat to Hereford United on 17 February 2009, went unbeaten until 13 April when they were finally defeated by League One Champions Leicester City. Despite this setback, Leeds bounced back five days later to win their 10th home game in succession, a record not matched since the days of Don Revie. The win secured Leeds a place in the League One Play-offs for the second successive season. Leeds faced Millwall in the Play-off Semi-finals after finishing the League One season in 4th place, but lost 2–1 on aggregate.

The 2009–10 season saw Leeds finally promoted to the Championship as they finished 2nd in League One with 86 Points. In the League Cup they gave an excellent performance against Premiership opposition Liverpool, narrowly losing 1–0. In the FA Cup Leeds caused a major upset in the 3rd round, beating then Premiership Champions Manchester United 1–0 at Old Trafford. In the 4th round the team claimed a 2–2 draw with Tottenham Hotspur, before losing the replay at Elland Road. Leeds also advanced to the Northern Area Final of the Johnstones Paint Trophy; however, after drawing with Carlisle United over two matches, Leeds lost in a penalty shoot-out. The end of the FA Cup run saw a serious dip in form, with the team falling as low as fifth at one point. However, their form improved again as the season drew to a close, leaving Leeds back in second place going into the final match of the season. Leeds United beat Bristol Rovers 2–1 in their final league game of the season and clinched promotion back to the Championship after a 3-year exile in League One.

On 27 November 2008 it was revealed that in their first 14 months of operation under the guidance of Leeds United Football Club Limited the club had made an operating profit of £902,000 before the inclusion of player trading from a turnover of £23,249,000. Once player trading had been included this profit rose to £4.5 million. This was in stark contrast to the financial year to June 2006 from the previous club owners Leeds United Association Football Club Limited, who lost £4.5 million and had debts approaching £25 million.

== 2010–2014, return to the Championship ==
Leeds spent much of the next season in the playoff places, but eventually finished in a respectable 7th place – just missing out on the playoffs. They also finished the season as the best supported club in the entire Football League with an average attendance of 27,299; the attendance figure was also higher than the average attendances of 9 Premier League clubs.

In May 2011 it was announced that Leeds chairman Ken Bates had bought the club and became the owner of Leeds. Before the match against Middlesbrough, Leeds fans protested at Ken Bates about lack of investment in the playing side, in which Bates responded by calling Leeds fans 'morons'.

Despite securing promotion to The Championship, Grayson was sacked after failing to mount a consistent challenge for promotion to the Premier League. Neil Warnock was appointed as the club's new manager on 18 February, with his initial contract lasting until the end of the 2012–13 season.

On 21 November 2012, Middle East-based private equity group GFH Capital finalised a deal for a protracted takeover of Leeds, gaining 100% shareholding in the club. It was also announced Ken Bates would remain as chairman until the end of the 2012–13 season and then become club president. The takeover was officially completed on 21 December 2012.

== 2014–2017, the Cellino era ==
On 5 April, Cellino was successful in his appeal with independent QC Tim Kerr to take over the club. The takeover was completed on 10 April, with Cellino's company, Eleonora Sport Limited, buying 75% of the club's shares. Two months later, the inexperienced Dave Hockaday was surprisingly appointed head coach, with Junior Lewis hired as his assistant. The decision was met with surprise and anger from Leeds United fans, and after only 70 days, the pair were fired by Cellino. Darko Milanič was given the head coach position in September 2014, but left the club the following month. On 1 November 2014, Neil Redfearn was confirmed as the new head coach.

On 1 December 2014, Cellino was disqualified by the Football League after it obtained documents from an Italian court, where he was found guilty of tax evasion. He was disqualified from running the club until 10 April 2015, and on 24 February 2015, Cellino announced he would not be returning to the club after his ban ended. Redfearn was replaced by Uwe Rosler as head coach in the summer of 2015, but Rosler was himself replaced by Steve Evans after only a few months in the role.

On 30 October 2015, Cellino agreed a deal in principle with Leeds Fans Utd to sell a majority stake in the club. When asked to legally commit to an exclusivity period to allow due diligence to commence, he reneged.

On 2 June 2016 Garry Monk was appointed as the new head coach, replacing Steve Evans.

On 4 January 2017, Italian businessman Andrea Radrizzani purchased a 50% stake in the club from Massimo Cellino.

At the close of the 2016/17 season, Leeds narrowly missed out on the Championship play-offs. Leeds had been in the play-off positions for the majority of the season before a poor run of form in the final games saw them drop into seventh place. This was compounded by being knocked out in the Fourth Round of the FA Cup by non-league side Sutton United 1–0, who, at the time, were 84 places and 4 divisions below Leeds United.

== 2017–2023, the Radrizzani era, return to the Premier League ==
Honours won: EFL Championship (2019–20)

Semi-Finalists: Championship Play off Semi-Final (2018–19)

On 23 May 2017, Radrizzani announced a 100% buyout of Leeds United, buying the remaining 50% shares from previous co-owner Massimo Cellino, with Radrizzani taking full ownership of the club. Garry Monk resigned as head coach two days after the takeover, after one season at the club in which he guided them to seventh place. In June 2017, former Spain international Thomas Christiansen was announced as the new Head Coach of Leeds, joining from APOEL. This was followed by Radrizzani introducing Leeds United Ladies back to Leeds United ownership. Also in June, Radrizzani completed the purchase of Elland Road, returning the stadium freehold to the club, who had not owned it since 2004.

In January 2018, Leeds announced an official partnership with Aspire Academy in Qatar. Aspire own Spanish team Cultural Leonesa who saw Leeds players Yosuke Ideguchi and Ouasim Bouy both join them on loan as part of the partnership. On 4 February 2018, Thomas Christiansen was sacked after a bad run of games (not a single win since Boxing Day 2017 across all competitions) leaving the team 10th in the Championship table. On 6 February, Paul Heckingbottom was confirmed as Christiansen's replacement, just four days after signing a new contract at Barnsley.

On 24 April, it was announced that Leeds United would go on tour in Myanmar in the post-season following the 2017–18 campaign and despite the 2017 Rohingya persecution, which has been described by the UN as ethnic cleansing, two games took place. On 24 May 2018, Leeds announced that 49ers Enterprises had bought shares in the club to become a minority investor. The 49ers Enterprises is the business arm of the NFL side San Francisco 49ers, owned by Denise DeBartolo York, Jed York and John York.

Heckingbottom was sacked by Leeds on 1 June 2018 after being at the club for just four months. Argentine manager Marcelo Bielsa was named the club's new manager on 15 June, signing a two-year contract with an option of a third year. In doing so he became the highest-paid manager in Leeds United's history.

The start of Bielsa's reign saw Leeds make an impressive start and after nine games, Leeds were at the top of the Championship. Following a number of injuries and a 2–1 loss to Blackburn Rovers on 20 October, Leeds fell into the play-off places, only to return to the top four days later after a 2–0 win against Ipswich Town. A 4–1 defeat at West Bromwich Albion on 10 November sent Leeds back to 3rd place; however, the side spent Christmas at the top of the table after winning the next seven games in a row, the last of those being a 3–2 win at Aston Villa on 23 December, as Leeds recovered from 2–0 down with Kemar Roofe scoring a 95th-minute winner.

Before a 2–0 victory over Derby County on 11 January 2019, manager Bielsa admitted he had sent a spy to the Derby training ground, after reports emerged in the press that a man was spotted the previous day outside the Derby training ground. Derby manager Frank Lampard was critical of Bielsa's method. On 12 January, Leeds United released a statement in response to the incident. Tottenham Hotspur Manager Mauricio Pochettino described the incident as 'not a big deal' and commonplace in Argentina. Manchester City Manager Pep Guardiola, when asked about Bielsa's due to his scouting methods, described him as 'the best' and 'everyone who works with him is a better player and the teams are better. That's why he's a special manager and special person'. On 15 January, the EFL announced they would be investigating the incident. With intense media scrutiny on what was coined 'Spygate' in the media, Bielsa announced a press briefing on 16 January 2019, where he gave a detailed analysis of his research on a PowerPoint presentation to the gathered media and journalists, detailing his meticulousness, thoroughness and preparation over his opponents, with some journalists in attendance describing it as a 'coaching masterclass' and 'genius'. Bielsa's 'Spygate' saga was resolved on 18 February, when Leeds were fined a sum of £200,000 by the EFL for breach of a portion of Rule 3.4 of EFL Regulations ("In all matters and transactions relating to The League each Club shall behave towards each other Club and The League with the utmost good faith."), with the EFL also announcing a new rule as a result, that teams could not watch opposition training up to 72 hours before a game. It was subsequently revealed, by Bielsa, that he paid the £200,000 fine in full himself.

After being in the top two with Norwich City for the majority of the season, with four games of the season remaining, Leeds were still sat second in the Championship table, three points clear of third place and on course for automatic promotion to the Premier League. However, the team went on to lose three of their remaining four fixtures, including a shock 1–2 defeat against 10 man Wigan Athletic which led to Sheffield United over taking them on goal difference, thus losing out on automatic promotion overall by six points to Sheffield United. This period included a 1–1 home draw to Aston Villa, where a controversial goal scored by Mateusz Klich, after an Aston Villa player was injured, lead to the team allowing Aston Villa to score and equalise in response. This result guaranteed a 3rd-placed finish in the league, and ensured participation in the Championship promotion playoffs.

It was Leeds' first play-off campaign since they regained promotion back to the EFL Championship. Leeds had several key players out injured for the playoff campaign and proceeded to lose 4–3 on aggregate to 6th placed Derby County in the play-off semi finals, having won 1–0 away at Pride Park in the first leg, before losing the return home leg 4–2 including playing with 10 men after a red card to Gaetano Berardi to consign the club to another season in the Championship.

In the 2019–20 season, Leeds finally ended their 16-year spell without Premier League football. On 17 July, West Brom failed to defeat Huddersfield Town, which guaranteed promotion from the Championship to the Premier League for the Whites.

Leeds won the league, having finished the season ten points clear of second-placed West Bromwich Albion.

The club’s first season back in the Premier League produced a top half finish, their points tally was the most by a newly promoted side since Ipswich Town two decades earlier. However, the following season was not as successful and following a series of poor results, Bielsa was sacked by the club in February 2022. Jesse Marsch was appointed as Bielsa's replacement, and he successfully led the club to avoid relegation on the final day of the season, following a 2–1 win over Brentford at the Brentford Community Stadium. Marsch was sacked by the club in February 2023, following their 1–0 defeat to Nottingham Forest at the City Ground.

Former Watford manager Javi Gracia was appointed as Marsch's replacement in February 2023. Gracia was sacked in May 2023, having won just three of his twelve games in charge, he was replaced by Sam Allardyce as the club aimed to avoid relegation for the second successive season, but he was unable to prevent relegation as Leeds dropped back into the Championship on the final day of the season.

=== 2023–present: 49ers Enterprises ownership ===
49ers Enterprises, the investment arm of the National Football League's San Francisco 49ers, had held a minority stake in Leeds United since 2018, increasing its shareholding to around 44% by 2021. On 18 July 2023, 49ers Enterprises completed a full takeover of the club, buying the remaining shares from Andrea Radrizzani in a deal reported to value Leeds at about £170 million, reduced from an earlier Premier League-contingent figure after the club's relegation that summer. Paraag Marathe, previously vice-chairman, became chairman. Under the new ownership, Leeds won the EFL Championship in 2024–25 to return to the Premier League after two seasons in the second tier.

== See also ==
- Doing a Leeds
- List of Leeds United F.C. records and statistics
