= Doing a Leeds =

English football phrase

Leeds United's historical League position; their fall from grace follows the 2000–01 Champions League semi-final.

Another commonly cited example is that of Portsmouth, whose decline immediately follows their 2008 FA Cup victory.

"Doing a Leeds" is an English football phrase which is synonymous with the potentially dire consequences for domestic clubs in financial mismanagement. The phrase arose after the rapid decline of then Premier League club Leeds United, who invested heavily in the late 1990s and early 2000s to attain domestic and lucrative European success, which was capped by high profile appearances in the semi-finals of the UEFA Cup and UEFA Champions League. However, in the process, the club built up large debts, and suffered financial meltdown after failing to continue to qualify for the competition, subsequently dropping down two levels of the football pyramid, into the third tier, Football League One.

Since the creation of the Premier League, a total of 24 clubs to have participated in the league have been relegated to League One, of which seven fell down further into the fourth tier (Football League Two) and only Oldham Athletic have fallen further into the fifth tier (the National League). Because they had never previously experienced relegation to League One or its predecessors, Leeds were the object of careful observation by media and derision by rival fans.

== The fall and rise of Leeds United ==
As champions of the final First Division season, Leeds United were one of the inaugural 22 clubs of the Premier League, the breakaway top division league competition formed in 1992. Leeds had sustained success in the league in late 1990s, and ultimately reached the semi-finals of the 2000–01 Champions League. Their level of spending to do so however had exceeded all other clubs, and the club's debt level rose annually from £9m to £21m, £39m, £82m and peaked at around £119m, much of the money having been spent on transfer fees and players' wages. After the club failed to qualify for the 2002–03 Champions League by only finishing fifth in the Premier League, it had to make drastic savings by selling players as it could no longer sustain the debt repayments, which relied on the ticket sales and television income from the European competition.

At the end of the 2003–04 FA Premier League season, Leeds United were relegated to the Football League Championship. The financial effects continued, and with one game to go in the 2006–07 season, the club voluntarily entered administration once their relegation was all but mathematically confirmed, incurring a 10-point league penalty served in the current season, thereby avoiding that penalty the following season. This was first time the club had ever been in the third tier of English football. Subsequent breaches of financial rules in the summer nearly resulted in the club being expelled from the Football League altogether (a fate which coincidentally had befallen the club's predecessors, Leeds City), but they were ultimately re-admitted with a 15-point penalty to apply to the 2007–08 season. Despite further appeals, the penalty stood and ultimately cost the club promotion that season.

At the end of the 2009–10 season, the club was promoted back to the Championship after a final day victory. They would remain in the Championship for a decade until they finally earned a promotion back to the Premier League for the 2020–21 season, under the management of Marcelo Bielsa, having coming close to earning promotion in the 2018–19 season, where the club narrowly missed out on a play-off final spot. However, after finishing a respectable 9th in the first season back in the Premier League, the club's fortunes dipped again, narrowly avoiding relegation on the final day of the 2021–22 season, before suffering relegation back to the Championship on the final day of the 2022–23 season. The club lost the 2024 Championship play-off final to Southampton, but would ultimately be promoted back to the Premier League in 2024–25 after dramatically winning the Championship title over Burnley on the final day of the season.

== "Doing a Leeds" ==
The term "doing a Leeds" or to "do a Leeds" has since become synonymous with financial mismanagement of a football club with potential dire consequences. It can refer specifically to any club that fails to plan adequately for the financial impact of either failure to qualify for the Champions League, or of not adequately restructuring following relegation from the Premier League to avoid a further drop, or more generally, to the rapid demise in the relative standing of any club.

Managers and chairmen, although sometimes obliged to "chase the dream" (the inevitable precursor of "doing a Leeds"), are often forced to deny they are "doing a Leeds" in the wake of a large investment that some analysts predict cannot be afforded by their club and may overstretch their budget. Similarly, fans may fear their club will "do a Leeds" if its expensively acquired and maintained team is unable to qualify for the Champions League or is relegated from the Premier League, thereby failing to "live the dream".

Conversely, the avoidance of "doing a Leeds" has been invoked by managers to justify selling their best players in order to raise funds to stave off going into administration, which might lead to a relegation-inducing penalty. Failure to invest at the expected "normal" rate in order to maintain a club's league position can be labelled as "doing a Leeds".

The phrase was notably used during the relegation of Newcastle United in 2009, one of the largest clubs to be relegated from the Premier League. Having bought the club, new owner Mike Ashley stated that his investment had in fact saved the club from "doing a Leeds". In spite of this Newcastle suffered relegation at the end of the 2008–09 season, sparking fears both before and after that the club could "do a Leeds" and drop further, into League One, without restructuring. However, the club avoided this and bounced back the following season with automatic first place promotion.

The 2010 announcement of Manchester United's need to refinance their large debt as a bond issue following their purchase by Malcolm Glazer led to questions in the media whether even Manchester United, as the most successful Premier League-era club, could be in danger of "doing a Leeds".

The term has been applied to Portsmouth. Despite their win in the 2007–08 FA Cup, the club amassed debts which eventually saw them become the first Premier League club to enter administration in the 2009–10 season, leading to relegation in the same season after the subsequent nine-point penalty. Portsmouth were relegated to League One after the 2011–12 season of the Football League Championship, due to a 10-point deduction for entering administration; a near-identical scenario to what occurred to Leeds five years previously. They were again relegated after a 10-point deduction due to failing to pay footballing creditors, this time to League Two, in the 2012–13 season.

Bolton Wanderers are another team guilty of "Doing a Leeds", after enjoying a successful stint in the Premier League under Sam Allardyce, which culminated in qualifying for the UEFA Cup, reaching the last 16 in the latter, which included a draw and a victory against Atlético Madrid, and draws against Bayern Munich and Sporting CP. After Allardyce's departure, the club began a steady decline, with relegation battles being a regular feature. The club then began a rapid decline that ultimately led to relegation on the last day of the 2011–12 season, and after languishing in the second tier for a few seasons, the club announced debts of £172.9m in 2015 and then were relegated to League One in 2016. They would be relegated from the Championship (tier two) again in 2019 and the club was nearly expelled from the football league due to its financial woes: a new buyer was found but the club was nevertheless deducted 12 points for entering administration (because Bolton finished in the bottom three in the Championship in 2018-19, the points deduction was applied in the 2019–20 season in League One.) In 2019–20 Bolton was relegated to League Two (the fourth tier) for the first time since 1988, although the club achieved promotion back to League One at the first attempt in 2020–21. 5 years later, Bolton would achieve promotion to the Championship after beating Stockport County in the 2026 League 1 play-off final.

A similar phrase, "Doing a Bradford", was coined by former Blackburn Rovers player Simon Garner in 2012, a scenario that he was worried could befall his former club, Bradford City, following their relegation from the Premier League in 2001. They then fell three divisions to League Two, and were not promoted back to League One until 2013. The only other former Premier League clubs to have fallen to League Two are Swindon Town (in 2006 and then 2011, though they immediately gained promotion to League One on both occasions), Portsmouth, Blackpool, Coventry City, Oldham Athletic and Bolton Wanderers.

Ralf Rangnick, then sporting director of German Bundesliga club RB Leipzig, compared the mismanagement of TSV 1860 Munich to that of Leeds United, drawing direct parallels between the ownership and resulting fan dissatisfaction at both clubs. The two clubs in fact met in a Champions League fixture in 2000, before both experiencing relegation from their respective top flight leagues in the following seasons.

== Non-english examples ==
Shelbourne were referred to as the "Irish version of Leeds United" after winning the League of Ireland Premier Division in 2006 but being automatically demoted into the League of Ireland First Division for financial reasons.

In Brazilian football, "Cruzeirar" (doing a Cruzeiro) has the same meaning of "doing a Leeds", but refers to Cruzeiro's dramatic decline, from two consecutive national titles in 2013 and 2014 to barely escaping relegation to Série C in 2020, due to serious financial mismanagement.

== See also ==
- History of Leeds United F.C.
- List of Leeds United F.C. seasons
- Premier League–Football League gulf
