= Mick Bates (English footballer) =

English footballer (1947–2021)

Personal information
- Full name: Michael Bates
- Date of birth: 19 September 1947
- Place of birth: Armthorpe, Doncaster, England
- Date of death: 12 July 2021 (aged 73)
- Height: 5 ft 7 in (1.70 m)
- Position: Midfielder

Youth career
- 1962–1966: Leeds United

Senior career*
Years	Team	Apps	(Gls)
1962–1976	Leeds United	187	(9)
1976–1978	Walsall	85	(4)
1978–1980	Bradford City	56	(1)
1980–1981	Doncaster Rovers	4	(0)
Total		332	(11)
- * Club domestic league appearances and goals

Michael Bates (19 September 1947 – 12 July 2021) was an English footballer who played as a midfielder in the Football League for Leeds United, Walsall, Bradford City and Doncaster Rovers. He is best known for playing for Leeds during the Don Revie period.

== Career ==
Bates was born in Armthorpe, Doncaster, and began his football career as an apprentice with Leeds United. Although primarily a squad player at Elland Road, not being able to break into the regular eleven due to Billy Bremner and Johnny Giles not releasing their places in the sides, Bates was still an excellent part of Don Revie's Leeds squad of the 1960s and early 1970s. Signing professional forms in 1964, Bates made 187 appearances for Leeds scoring nine goals, including one against Juventus in the 2–2 first leg of the Fairs Cup Final of 1971 away in Turin. This goal along with a 1–1 score-line at Elland Road helped Leeds to triumph in the competition with Leeds winning on the away goals rule. Leeds won the league twice during his time at the club in 1969 and 1974. Bates contributed only four appearances to the first of these titles but ten, enough for a medal, to the second. He remained loyal to Leeds for 12 years despite the fact he would have probably retained a regular place in most other sides. A repetition of knee injuries between 1974 and 1976 kept him out of the action for much of that time. He eventually left Leeds in the summer of 1976, going to Walsall for £25,000. Bates later had spells at Bradford City, from 1978 to 1980 joining for £20,000 and Doncaster Rovers, joining for free. He retired from professional football in 1981 and ran his own insurance firm.

He died on 12 July 2021, aged 73.

== Honours ==
- FA Cup: 1972
- Inter-Cities Fairs Cup: 1968, 1971
- First Division: 1973–74
