= Michael Ezra =

Ugandan businessman and philanthropist

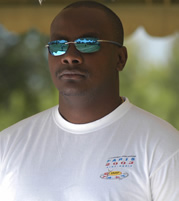
- Michael Ezra Mulyoowa
- Born: 20 July 1973 (age 52); Kampala

Michael Ezra Mulyoowa, also known as Michael Ezra Kato, is a Ugandan businessman and philanthropist who has been repeatedly indicted on criminal charges.

== Biography ==
=== Early life ===
Ezra was born in Kampala on 20 July 1973 to Beatrice Nantongo, a retired Commissioner of the Uganda Police. He is the second of five siblings. He attended Kitante Primary School and Makerere College School.

=== 1999 arrest ===
In August 1999, Ezra was arrested and charged with using fake identification to present himself as an officer of the Directorate of Military Intelligence and using to this to try to extort US$50,000. He pled guilty to three counts of impersonation, demanding money by menaces, and forgery, and was released after a fine.

=== Business and philanthropic activity ===
Ezra is a former Uganda national team sprinter. Ezra is known for his financial support of Ugandan sports teams. Ezra is reported to own Sunspace International, a holding company registered in the Seychelles.

In 2003, Ezra announced a USh 12 million (US$6111) sponsorship of the Uganda team headed for the World Athletics Cross Country Championships.

In 2004, Ezra Track Team Board (ETTB) established a national athletics camps across Uganda with the aim of scouting talent.

In June 2004, he made the Government of Uganda a US$30 million offer to purchase the Uganda National Stadium (Mandela National Stadium). In February 2004, Ezra made an unsuccessful £60 million bid to buy then–English Premiership club Leeds United, causing the club's shares to go up by 14%. In March 2004, he spent roughly US$500,000 on the Uganda national boxing team, The Bombers, for a qualification campaign and a nine-month camp in the run-up to the 2004 Summer Olympics.

In October 2006, Ezra expanded ETTB's activities into football (soccer), by spending USh 60,000,000/= to send a cash-strapped Uganda national team, The Cranes, to Niamey, Niger for an Africa Cup of Nations qualifier. In November 2006, he paid over US$250,000 for an exclusive Mont Blanc wristwatch. The "one of one" timepiece was the object of an Emirates auction commemorating 100 years of Mont Blanc. The timepiece was handed over to the Ugandan Businessman by His Highness Sheik Ahmed bin Saeed Al-Maktoum in Dubai. In December 2006, he was named the man of the year by a public poll held annually by New Vision. He was the runner-up for four years: 2003, 2004, 2005, and 2007.

In September 2007, he awarded The Cranes US$100,000 after they beat Niger in a qualifier.

In May 2008, he went shopping for an A380 from the French aircraft maker Airbus to be used as a private jet.

In July 2009, a US$5.93 million scam targeting him was discovered. The perpetrator was an American internet con artist.

In October 2010, Ezra stated he would award the Cranes US$650,000 should they qualify for the 2012 African Cup of Nations. In October 2011, announced he would award the Cranes half of the earlier pledge, despite them not qualifying for the tournament.

=== Accusations of unpaid taxes and dishonoured cheques ===
In August 2010, upon arrival to Uganda, local media reported that Ezra had about USh 1.1 billion (approximately US$500,000) in unpaid taxes. This prompted the Uganda Revenue Authority (URA) to request a travel ban on him and the freezing of his assets. Around the same time it was alleged that Ezra was ordered by the Commercial Court in Uganda to pay back a loan of 430,000,000/= (approx. $195,000), plus interest, to the National Bank of Commerce. In September 2010, he held a press conference at the Emin Pasha hotel in Kampala, and displaying a stack of US$3 million, stating he had been purposely evasive.

In October 2010, Ugandan police issued summons against Ezra for two bounced cheques worth USh 2 billion. Ezra, who left Uganda, claimed his payments had been blocked because he owed the URA USh 1.6 million. In February 2011, Michael Ezra was arrested by the Kenyan police. It was said Ezra had not honoured court summons to defend himself against allegations that he issued a dishonoured cheque worth USh 15.4 million (US$200,000) to a Kenyan company. Ezra, through his lawyers, denied the charges. His lawyer argued that the offence was a misdemeanor and bailable. He further argued that Ezra was a prominent international businessman who owned numerous properties in Kenya and was not arrested but handed himself to the authorities and therefore was not a flight risk. The Judge granted him bail of KSh 6 million (US$78,000). Ezra's lawyer claimed in court that a Kenyan businessman was framing Ezra with the intention of extorting money from him. In February 2012 and again in July 2013, he was charged in a Kenyan court for issuing bounced cheques, but was acquitted on both charges as "the prosecution had not proved its case beyond reasonable doubt".
