= Premier League–Football League gulf =

Rift between the top two tiers of English football

In English football, a gulf has arisen between the finances of clubs from the Premier League and English Football League since the First Division clubs broke away to form the Premier League in 1992. Some have argued that this disparity is wider than in other European leagues where the top flight is combined with at least one division below in a league, such as Germany's Bundesliga, Italy's Serie A and Spain's La Liga. However, England has five tiers of single national divisions, compared to only two in Spain and Italy and three in Germany.

== Finance ==
Since the Premier League began at the start of the 1992–93 season, its member teams have received larger amounts of money in TV rights than their Football League colleagues. Prior to the formation of the Premier League, television revenues from top flight matches were shared between the 92 Football League clubs across four unified national professional divisions. The breakaway of 22 clubs to form the Premier League resulted in top flight revenues being shared exclusively between Premier League clubs. The Premier League agreed to maintain the promotion and relegation of three clubs with the Football League, but the Football League was now in a far weaker position – without its best clubs and without the clout to negotiate high revenue TV deals. This problem was exacerbated in 2002 when ITV Digital, the holder of the TV rights for the Football League, went into administration. Many League clubs had invested in ground improvements and the player transfer market with anticipated television funds that never materialized, causing several clubs to enter receivership – most notably Bradford City, who were faced with debts of £36 million and almost lost their Football League status as a result.

As a result, financial disparity has been cited as a reason for newly promoted teams finding it increasingly harder to establish themselves in the Premier League, thus worrying more about avoiding relegation than even winning the title. In all but four of the 31 seasons since its introduction, at least one newly promoted club filled one of the three Premier League relegation places, and in the 1997–98, 2023–24 and 2024–25 seasons, all three promoted clubs (Bolton Wanderers, Barnsley and Crystal Palace) in 1997–98, (Luton Town, Burnley and Sheffield United) in 2023–24 and (Ipswich Town, Leicester City and Southampton) in 2024–25 were relegated.

The only exceptions, in which all three promoted teams survived, were the 2001–02, 2011–12, 2017–18, and 2022–23 seasons. In 2001–02, the teams were Fulham, Blackburn Rovers, and Bolton Wanderers; Blackburn and Bolton were eventually relegated in 2011–12, and Fulham in 2013–14. (Fulham have since returned to the Premier League multiple times. In 2018–19 and 2020–21, Fulham were relegated immediately after only one season back in the Premier League. They were then promoted for a third time in 2022–23.) In 2011–12, the teams were Queens Park Rangers, Norwich City, and Swansea City; QPR was relegated in the following season, and Norwich in 2013–14, while Swansea was eventually relegated in 2017–18. Norwich and QPR both immediately bounced back from their relegations in the following season, earning promotion through winning the Championship playoffs in 2014 and 2015 respectively, however, they were both relegated back to the Championship in the seasons that followed. Norwich returned again in both 2019–20 and 2021–22 seasons, where they were once again relegated in both. QPR is still yet to return. In 2017–18, the teams were Brighton & Hove Albion, Newcastle United, and Huddersfield Town; Huddersfield were relegated in the following season, while the other two teams are still competing in the Premier League. Five years later, in 2022–23, Fulham, Bournemouth, and Nottingham Forest all avoided relegation. All three teams are still competing in the Premier League.

=== Parachute Payments ===
The Premier League distributes a small portion of its television revenue to clubs that are relegated from the league in the form of "parachute payments". Starting with the 2018-19 season, the league stopped disclosing the breakdown of parachute payments each year. For clubs that have spent one season in the Premier League, 55% of the total parachute payment is paid in the first year following relegation, with the remaining 45% in year 2. Should a club survive at least an additional season in the Premier League before relegation, they'll receive an additional £20 million payment in year 3. The three relegated clubs during the 2023–24 season, namely Burnley, Sheffield United and Luton Town received £49 million each in parachute payments during the 2024–25 season. Though designed to help teams adjust to the loss of television revenues (the average Premier League team receives £142 million while the average Football League Championship club receives £7.8 million), critics maintain that the payments actually widen the gap between teams that have reached the Premier League and those that have not, leading to the common occurrence of teams returning soon after their relegation.

One example of the struggles associated with adapting to relegation would be that of previous Premier League champions Blackburn Rovers, who were relegated from the top flight on 7 May 2012, and struggled to stay in the EFL Championship over the next five seasons before finally dropping to League One on 7 May 2017, earning the dubious distinction of being the only former Premier League champions to play at that level. This was in spite of Rovers initially spending substantial amounts of money following their relegation from the Premier League, breaking their transfer record to land Jordan Rhodes for £8 million in the 2012–13 season. Rovers would proceed to become a cost-cutting club, due to the exhaustion of their parachute payments across multiple seasons, large amounts of debts beginning to surface reportedly within the region of £100 million, and a lack of investment from their owners Venkys, culminating in their relegation to League One.

Another notable example of a former Premier League club that has struggled both financially and competitively, despite being in receipt of parachute payments, would be that of Bolton Wanderers. Having spent beyond their means throughout the club's 11-year tenure in the top flight, Bolton steadily declined with regards to league position in the years following their Premier League relegation in 2012, eventually dropping down to League One in 2016. That season, the club's perilous financial situation necessitated the sale of their Euxton training ground and a car park in use by the club. The club had amassed debts of £186 million to their previous owner Eddie Davies, of which £171 million was eventually written off in order to assist with selling the club. Bolton Wanderers and its parent company Sports Shield BWFC, have faced multiple winding up petitions from HM Revenue and Customs for unpaid loan debts to various external businesses amounting to approximately £30 million; including an unpaid £5 million loan to BluMarble, a finance company that had provided funds to facilitate a takeover deal for the club in March 2017, and an overdue loan debt of £5.5 million to Prescot Business Park Ltd. Bolton's most recent financial accounts have produced forecasts that predict an annual loss of roughly £11 million, with the club judged "unable to meet ongoing costs". The parent company Sports Shield BWFC was wound up in August 2017 after a court hearing, with initial fears that Bolton would face a points deduction as a result, however the club avoided such sanction.

In spite of the club being under a transfer embargo imposed by the Football League for almost two years from late 2015 to September 2017, with the club being limited to free transfers and loans under a pre-determined wage cap, Bolton earned promotion back to the Championship at the first time of asking under manager Phil Parkinson in the 2016–17 season.

The payments have been also criticized as causing Premier League teams to play more cautiously — playing not to lose instead of playing to win — because the threat of relegation means the loss of payments from the television rights. In fact, as of December 2006, the goals-per-game average is only 2.14, the lowest it has ever been in Premier League history and lower than any other professional league in Europe. Steve Bruce, at the time manager of Birmingham City, stated that,

It's a results business… The Championship is very entertaining at the moment because about 12 clubs think they can win it. In the Premiership you've got 12 clubs shit-scared of relegation, and that's the difference.

Ten years later, these words were re-confirmed by the 2016–17 season final table, which showed a distinct trinary hierarchy. The 7 teams gaining places in European football were between 15 and 47 points ahead of the next group of 10, which were all spanned by a difference of just 6 points. A further gap of 6 points separated those mid-ranking teams from the relegation zone.

== Curse of Christmas ==
The Curse of Christmas refers to a trend where the team at the bottom of the Premier League table at Christmas has been relegated at the end of the season. Since the league began, this has happened in every season except four: 2004–05, when West Bromwich Albion finished 17th, Sunderland, who avoided the drop in 2013–14, Leicester City who survived in the following season and Wolverhampton Wanderers who survived the drop in 2022–23. Swansea City managed a similar feat by being level on points with bottom club Hull City on Boxing Day, but survived in the 2016–17 season. West Brom were, in fact, still bottom of the table on the morning and even at half time in their final match of the last day of the 2004–05 season. However, a win over Portsmouth, combined with Norwich City and Southampton defeats and a draw for Crystal Palace, enabled them to move up three places and thus survive, an achievement since dubbed "The Great Escape". West Brom remain the only team to be bottom of the Premier League at Christmas, on the last day, even at half time, and still survive.

Every side that lay bottom at Christmas improved their form in the remaining matches – except for Derby County, West Brom, and Portsmouth over the three-year period of 2008 to 2010, Sheffield United in 2023–24, and Southampton in 2024–25. This can partially be explained by the January transfer window, enabling the struggling sides to improve their squads.

The four sides to have survived the drop despite being at the foot of the table at Christmas all improved their form by at least 0.64 points per game – just under the equivalent of two additional points for every three matches played. Only four other sides have increased their form by greater than this amount: Sheffield Wednesday (2000), West Ham United (2003), Sheffield United (2021) and Wolverhampton Wanderers (2026). Sheffield Wednesday, Sheffield United and Wolverhampton Wanderers had three of the four worst forms prior to Christmas, while West Ham achieved the highest points total from a 38-game season for a relegated side – achieving more points at the end of the season than the four sides who survived the drop despite being bottom at Christmas.

The last time a top-division team had achieved this feat was in the penultimate season of the pre-Premier League First Division, in 1990–91. The team in question was Sheffield United, who after 16 matches had no wins and only 4 points, before their form improved dramatically in the second half of the season and a run of seven successive wins helped them to finish in 13th place out of 20.

Certain teams are notable for extremely poor seasons as a result of inability to come to terms with the gulf:

- Swindon Town were the first such example in the 1993–94 season, when they won a mere five games out of 42 and conceded 100 goals (formerly a Premier League record, beaten by Sheffield United in the 2023–24 season) in their first and, to date, only season in the top flight. One of the few bright spots of the season came when they held Manchester United (who went on to win the league title and FA Cup) to a 2–2 draw at home in March, and having lost 4–2 away to them earlier in the season they scored more goals against the title-winning side than any other club in the league that season (bar Oldham Athletic, who were also relegated).
- In 2002–03, Sunderland were relegated having achieved record lows of four wins, 19 points, and 21 goals. They returned to the top flight in 2005–06, only to break two of these records - managing just three wins and 15 points - and also equal the record for most losses in a season, 29, which had previously been achieved by Ipswich Town in 1994–95. As some consolation, they scored more goals (26) than they had the previous time.
- In 2007–08, Derby County, appearing in the top flight for the first time since 2001–02, won just one game out of 38 (beating Newcastle United 1–0 at home on 17 September 2007 thanks to a Kenny Miller strike), finished with 11 points and scored just 20 goals, thus breaking all three of Sunderland's records. They also set new records for the most consecutive matches without a win (32) and the worst goal difference (−69), and equaled the record jointly held by Ipswich and Sunderland in achieving 29 losses. Finally, they became the first team to be officially relegated from the Premier League in March, and only the second team ever to achieve just one win in an entire season of an English professional league (the other being Loughborough in 1899–1900).
- In 2018–19, Fulham, appearing in the top flight for the first time since 2013–14, managed only seven wins all season and were relegated at the beginning of April with five games still to play. Their final tally of 26 points was, however, ten more than the tally achieved by bottom-placed Huddersfield Town.
- In 2019–20, Norwich City, who returned for the first time since 2015–16, suffered a terrible season and were relegated in bottom place despite a decent start, losing all nine games after the season was suspended because of the effects of the COVID-19 pandemic, scoring only one goal in the process. They set a Premier League record with the fewest away goals in a season and became the fourth team in five seasons to finish below 25 points, relegated with three games to spare after a defeat to West Ham United.
- In 2021–22, Norwich City and Watford, who immediately bounced back from their relegations, both suffered terrible seasons and finished with less than 25 points. They got relegated with four and three games to spare respectively. They both also subsequently failed to get promoted the next season and both ended up below the top 10 places in the Championship.
- In 2022–23, Southampton were relegated with only 25 points after an 11 year stay in the Premier League. They returned straight back up for 2024–25, only to suffer an even worse season and they were relegated at the beginning of April with seven games still to play, breaking a record for the earliest relegation in terms of games to spare in Premier League history. They finished with a mere 12 points, just one more point than Derby County in the 2007–08 season, and set a new record for most defeats in a season, with 30. Their fellow promoted clubs, Leicester City and Ipswich Town, also suffered terrible seasons and were relegated with five and four games to play respectively. All of them ended the season with 25 or fewer points.
- In 2023–24, Sheffield United, who returned after two seasons, suffered a terrible season and were relegated in bottom place with three games to spare. They finished with a mere 16 points, and set a new record for most goals conceded in a season. Their fellow promoted clubs, Burnley and Luton Town, both suffered terrible seasons and were relegated with 26 or fewer points.
- In 2025-26, Burnley, who bounced back from relegation, suffered another terrible season and finished with less than 25 points. They were relegated with four games to spare.

Season	Team	Points at Christmas	Final Position	Points at End of Season	P/G at Christmas	P/G after Christmas
1992–93	Nottingham Forest	15 (W3-D6-L11)	22nd of 22	40 (W10-D10-L22)	0.75	1.14
1993–94	Swindon Town	14 (W2-D8-L11)	22nd of 22	30 (W5-D15-L22)	0.67	0.76
1994–95	Ipswich Town	12 (W3-D3-L13)	22nd of 22	27 (W7-D6-L29)	0.63	0.65
1995–96	Bolton Wanderers	10 (W2-D4-L13)	20th of 20	29 (W8-D5-L25)	0.53	1.00
1996–97	Nottingham Forest	13 (W2-D7-L9)	20th of 20	34 (W6-D16-L16)	0.72	1.05
1997–98	Barnsley	14 (W4-D2-L13)	19th of 20	35 (W10-D5-L23)	0.74	1.11
1998–99	Nottingham Forest	13 (W2-D7-L11)	20th of 20	30 (W7-D9-L22)	0.65	0.94
1999–2000	Sheffield Wednesday	6 (W1-D3-L13)	19th of 20	31 (W8-D7-L23)	0.35	1.19
2000–01	Bradford City	12 (W2-D6-L11)	20th of 20	26 (W5-D11-L22)	0.63	0.74
2001–02	Ipswich Town	12 (W2-D6-L10)	18th of 20	36 (W9-D9-L20)	0.67	1.20
2002–03	West Ham United	14 (W3-D5-L11)	18th of 20	42 (W10-D12-L16)	0.74	1.47
2003–04	Wolverhampton Wanderers	11 (W2-D5-L9)	20th of 20	33 (W7-D12-L19)	0.69	1.00
2004–05	West Bromwich Albion	10 (W1-D7-L10)	17th of 20^{1}	34 (W6-D16-L16)	0.56	1.20
2005–06	Sunderland	5 (W1-D2-L14)	20th of 20	15 (W3-D6-L29)	0.29	0.48
2006–07	Watford	11 (W1-D8-L9)	20th of 20	28 (W5-D13-L20)	0.61	0.85
2007–08	Derby County	7 (W1-D4-L13)	20th of 20	11 (W1-D8-L29)	0.39	0.20
2008–09	West Bromwich Albion	18 (W5-D3-L12)	20th of 20	32 (W8-D8-L22)	0.90	0.78
2009–10	Portsmouth	14 (W4-D2-L12)	20th of 20	19^{2} (W7-D7-L24)	0.78	0.70^{2}
2010–11	West Ham United	13 (W2-D7-L9)	20th of 20	33 (W7-D12-L19)	0.72	1.00
2011–12	Blackburn Rovers	10 (W2-D4-L11)	19th of 20	31 (W8-D7-L23)	0.59	1.00
2012–13	Reading	9 (W1-D6-L11)	19th of 20	28 (W6-D10-L22)	0.50	0.95
2013–14	Sunderland	10 (W2-D4-L11)	14th of 20^{1}	38 (W10-D8-L20)	0.59	1.33
2014–15	Leicester City	10 (W2-D4-L11)	14th of 20^{1}	41 (W11-D8-L19)	0.59	1.48
2015–16	Aston Villa	7 (W1-D4-L12)	20th of 20	17 (W3-D8-L27)	0.41	0.48
2016–17	Hull City	12 (W3-D3-L11)	18th of 20	34 (W9-D7-L22)	0.71	1.05
2017–18	Swansea City	13 (W3-D4-L12)	18th of 20	33 (W8-D9-L21)	0.68	1.05
2018–19	Fulham	10 (W2-D4-L12)	19th of 20	26 (W7-D5-L26)	0.56	0.68
2019−20	Watford	12 (W2-D6-L10)	19th of 20	34 (W8-D10-L20)	0.67	1.10
2020−21	Sheffield United	2 (W0-D2-L12)^{3}	20th of 20	23 (W7-D2-L29)	0.14	0.88
2021−22	Norwich City	10 (W2-D4-L11)	20th of 20	22 (W5-D7-L26)	0.59	0.60
2022–23	Wolverhampton Wanderers	10 (W2-D4-L9)^{4}	13th of 20^{1}	41 (W11-D8-L19)	0.67	1.35
2023–24	Sheffield United	9 (W2-D3-L13)	20th of 20	16 (W3-D7-L28)	0.50	0.35
2024–25	Southampton	6 (W1-D3-L13)	20th of 20	12 (W2-D6-L30)	0.35	0.29
2025–26	Wolverhampton Wanderers	2 (W0-D2-L15)	20th of 20	20 (W3-D11-L24)	0.11	0.86

^1 Avoided relegation.
^2 Portsmouth were deducted nine points for entering administration. With these nine points, they would have still finished 20th. The points per game tally after Christmas does not take the points deduction into account.
^3 The 2020–21 season started in September, rather than August, due to the COVID-19 pandemic.
^4 The 2022–23 season paused between 13th November and 26th December, due to the 2022 FIFA World Cup.

== Unexpected performances ==
There have been some strong performances by newly promoted clubs in the Premier League – particularly in its first few seasons. Blackburn Rovers were among the three teams who won promotion to the Premier League upon its formation, and bankrolled by owner Jack Walker's millions they were able to attract some of the best players in English football – most notably £3.6 million national record signing Alan Shearer. They finished fourth in their first Premier League season after leading in the early stages. Ipswich Town, one of the other promoted teams that season, were among the top five clubs as late as February 1993 and were being tipped as surprise title contenders, but a late slump in form dragged them down to 16th place.

=== 1990s ===
In the second season of the Premier League, newly promoted Newcastle United finished third – the same position which was occupied by another newly promoted side, Nottingham Forest, the following year. Except for Ipswich Town in 2001, this was the last time a newly promoted club finished in the top five.

Middlesbrough finished 12th in the 1995–96 season after promotion, but 10 games into the season they occupied fourth place – high enough for UEFA Cup qualification – and were being touted as outsiders for the Premier League title.

In 1996–97, newly promoted Leicester City achieved top-flight survival for the first time since 1986 by finishing ninth and also winning the Football League Cup to end their 33-year trophy drought. Middlesbrough had been relegated from the Premier League in 1997 two years after promotion (though only through a points deduction) and were promoted back at the first attempt, and in their first Premier League campaign following relegation they finished ninth in the Premier League and only narrowly missed out on UEFA Cup qualification.

Sunderland were promoted to the Premier League as Division One champions with a new record of 105 league points in 1999 and marked their return to the top flight by finishing seventh and only missing out on UEFA Cup qualification on goal difference.

=== 2000s ===
Charlton Athletic's return to the Premier League as Division One champions for the 2000–01 season was marked with a ninth-place finish – their highest for some 50 years.

In 2001–02, Blackburn Rovers returned to the Premier League two years after relegation and marked it with their first League Cup triumph, and a late surge in form following the trophy win took them clear of the relegation zone to a tenth-place finish. Manchester City returned to the Premier League in 2002 a year after relegation by securing the Division One title, and marked their return to the top flight with a ninth-place finish – their highest in a decade. After two seasons of newly promoted clubs either being relegated or narrowly scraping survival, West Ham United finished ninth in the Premier League in 2005–06 and almost won the FA Cup (only missing out due to a late Liverpool equaliser and a penalty shoot-out defeat), while fellow promoted side Wigan Athletic enjoyed an even more remarkable season. They were rarely outside the top five in the first half of the season, and then reached their first major cup final – the League Cup final – which they lost to Manchester United. They eventually finished 10th in the final table.

Reading reached the top flight for the first time in their history for the 2006–07 season and finished eighth – narrowly missing out on UEFA Cup qualification.

Hull City reached the Premier League for the 2008–09 season, the first time they had ever appeared in the top flight and all the more remarkable considering they had begun the decade almost bankrupt in the league's basement division. An excellent start to the season saw them level on points in third place with the leading pack of Liverpool and Arsenal in mid-October, though their season gradually fell away from December onwards and they ended up surviving by just one point. Hull were relegated the following season but made a return to the Premier League several years later by finishing second in the 2012–13 Championship season, with experienced manager Steve Bruce in charge. Hull again survived their first season in the Premier League following promotion, finishing 16th in the 2013–14 season but they were relegated again the following season after drawing 0–0 with Manchester United on the last day of the season. Hull stuck with Bruce after relegation, who in the 2015–16 season got Hull promoted for the second time as manager through winning the 2016 Championship play-off final. Bruce left the club during the summer after disagreements with the board and frustration over the club's lack of transfer activity, leaving Hull in a crisis going into their Premier League season without a manager and an incredibly small squad of only 13 fit senior professionals. The season started well under caretaker manager Mike Phelan, winning their opening two fixtures, including a shock win over champions Leicester City on the opening day of the season, however as expected, Hull struggled throughout the season and were relegated, not helped by discontent amongst fans over the club's ownership, along with the lack of investment with regards to player transfers and effective preparation while the club was up for sale, and poor performances on the pitch. Marco Silva replaced Phelan in January and rejuvenated the team, getting some good results, in particular in a 2–0 home win over Liverpool and a point away at Old Trafford, however the damage had been done in the first half of the season, and Hull finished 18th. The following summer saw a large number of player departures and a new manager, Leonid Slutsky, joined the club. They finally returned to the Premier League in the 2026-27 season.

Stoke City returned to the top flight at the same time as Hull's promotion, having been in exile for 23 years and returned in reasonable style with a 12th-place finish. Stoke have since established themselves as a consistent mid-table Premier League club, under the management of Tony Pulis and more recently Mark Hughes, finishing 9th in the league for three consecutive seasons between 2013–14 to 2015–16, before eventually relegated in 2017–18.

Birmingham City, who had two spells in the Premier League between 2002 and 2008, returned to the elite for the 2009–10 campaign one season after relegation and secured a ninth-place finish, the club's best in decades and one of their highest ever.

=== 2010s ===
Norwich City returned to the top flight for the first time in seven years, a season when the team had to win against Fulham at Craven Cottage in order to survive but were relegated straight back to The Championship after a 6–0 defeat. After the 2008–09 season, the club were relegated to League One, only to win the league at the first time of asking despite an opening day 7–1 record league loss to Colchester United. The season after in 2010–11, Norwich earned their place back amongst the elite by gaining the second automatic promotion spot in the a Championship, with many pundits tipping the team for immediate relegation. However, they were consistent for most of the season, never being in any real danger of relegation, before finishing the season in 12th position. Norwich remained a Premier League club for two more seasons under the management of Chris Hughton but were relegated in the 2013–14 season, with the club sacking Hughton towards the tail end of the season as Norwich sat just above the relegation zone in 17th, appointing Neil Adams only to be relegated by not winning any of their remaining five games. Norwich bounced back to the Premier League at the first time of asking, under new manager Alex Neil, after winning the 2015 Championship play-off final against Middlesbrough, however their stay back in the Premier League was short lived as Norwich finished 19th in the 2015–16 season. They returned again in 2019–20 but were relegated again in last place after a terrible season despite a shocking 3–2 win over defending champions Manchester City. Their fate was sealed with a 4–0 defeat to West Ham United. They bounced back and returned for 2021–22, but were once again relegated after finishing at the bottom of the table.

Swansea City also returned to the top flight at the same time as Norwich's promotion, having been playing below the top division since their relegation in 1983, and were also in danger of leaving The Football League itself in 2003, only for a 4–2 win over Hull City on the final day at Vetch Field to confirm their survival. Two seasons later, in 2004–05, the team won League Two, under the guidance of Kenny Jackett, before following this up three seasons later, by winning League One under Roberto Martínez gaining a club record 92 points in the process. In the 2010–11 season, Swansea finally won promotion to the Premier League being the first Welsh team to do so, under Brendan Rodgers, after beating his former team Reading 4–2 in the play-off final at Wembley Stadium.

The season proved successful for the Welsh team, despite being heavily tipped by many pundits to be relegated. They returned in reasonable style finishing in 11th position, only one goal away to being in 10th position. Their season saw surprise wins over Arsenal, Manchester City, and Liverpool. The team also despite being newly promoted, scored the fastest goal of the 2011–12 season, when Andrea Orlandi scored within 24 seconds against Wolverhampton Wanderers in a 4–4 draw at the Liberty Stadium, a match that also confirmed Swansea's place in the 2012–13 Premier League season. In the 2012–13 season, Swansea qualified for the 2013–14 UEFA Europa League by winning the 2012–13 Football League Cup and finishing ninth in the Premier League. They spent a further five seasons in the Premier League before being effectively relegated after Chelsea drew Huddersfield 1–1. They were officially relegated on the final day during the 2017–18 season after a 2–1 loss to also relegated Stoke City.

In 2015, AFC Bournemouth earned promotion to the Premier League by winning the 2014–15 Football League Championship under the stewardship of young English manager Eddie Howe. The promotion formed part of an incredible rise up the Football League with the club having been close to liquidation only ten years prior when they were in League Two, and as recently as 2008 had gone into administration and nearly lost their Football League status. The club have since surprised many by consolidating themselves in the Premier League, finishing 16th in their first season in the top flight and then an impressive 9th in their second season, in spite of having limited spending power in relation to modern day Premier League figures. Key to Bournemouth's success was keeping a core of home-grown players together that had risen through the leagues with the club, Harry Arter and Marc Pugh establishing themselves at the highest level, having been lower league players beforehand. They stayed in the Premier League for five seasons before getting relegated in 2019–20 on the final day of the season. They returned for the 2022–23 season and avoided relegation, before breaking their points record in the Premier League in the next two seasons, finishing 12th and 9th respectively. They qualified for Europe for the first time in the 2025-26 season, finishing in 6th place and earning qualification to the Europa League.

In 2017, Brighton & Hove Albion earned promotion to the Premier League for the first time in their history after finishing second in the 2016–17 EFL Championship, having missed out on top spot to Newcastle United on the final day of the season after failing to win any of their final three games, with one win was enough. Their first Premier League season went well, and they secured their Premier League status after a 1–0 victory against Manchester United on 4 May 2018, finishing in 15th place. They have since maintained their Premier League status, with their sixth place finish in the 2022–23 season resulting in their highest ever finish in the top flight and their first-ever qualification for Europe in the Europa League. They went on to earn another European qualification in the Conference League in the 2025-26 season despite a defeat on the final day, finishing in 8th place after other results went their way.

Also in 2017, Huddersfield Town also earned promotion to the Premier League for the first time in their history by winning the 2017 Championship play-off final, having finished in 19th place in the Championship the season prior and having only had a £12 million playing budget in their possession, a significantly lower figure in comparison to other clubs such as Aston Villa, who were backed by the wealthy Recon Group and were in receipt of parachute payments. Many had tipped Huddersfield to struggle in the Championship in a similar manner to previous seasons, however the club made an unexpected appointment in former Borussia Dortmund II manager David Wagner, who employed a high-tempo pressing style of play and made shrewd acquisitions in the transfer market, mainly utilising loan deals from larger clubs and with Christopher Schindler being the club's record transfer at £1.2 million. They finished 16th in the 2017–18 season, after drawing with Manchester City and Chelsea. However, Huddersfield was relegated in the following season, suffering relegation in the month of March; becoming only the second team in Premier League history to achieve this feat. Manager David Wagner left Huddersfield by mutual consent in January with the club rooted to the bottom of the table having only earned 11 points throughout the season, and his replacement Jan Siewert could not mastermind an unlikely survival, losing eight of his first nine games in charge; a solitary victory against Wolverhampton Wanderers, plus a later draw vs. Manchester United and Southampton, left Huddersfield finishing on 16 points and 20 points adrift of safety.

In 2018, Wolverhampton Wanderers was promoted to the Premier League only five years after enduring a "double drop", being relegated from the 2011–12 Premier League and 2012–13 Football League Championship. In the 2018–19 Premier League season, Wolves finished seventh and earned 57 points, the most by a promoted team since Ipswich Town's 66-point finish in 2000–01. They earned victories over Arsenal, Chelsea, Tottenham and Manchester United, and also qualified for the 2019–20 UEFA Europa League through league position.

In 2019, Sheffield United, who returned to the Premier League after 12 years, finished ninth in the 2019–20 season with 54 points, only missing out on European football by five points. They were the second promoted team in as many seasons to finish with at least 50 points and did not lose a single away game until December when they lost 2–0 at Manchester City.

=== 2020s ===
In 2020, Leeds United, who returned to the Premier League after 16 years, finished ninth in the 2020–21 season with 59 points, the most by a newly promoted side since Ipswich Town in the 2000–01 season, only missing out on European football by three points, having an outside chance of qualifying to the Conference League until the final day, however both Tottenham Hotspur and Arsenal won their fixtures. They were the third promoted team in as many seasons to finish with at least 50 points, and didn't lose a single game at home all season against the Premier League Big Six.

In 2021, Brentford returned to the top flight after a 74-year absence, making their debut in the rebranded Premier League. They finished 13th in the 2021–22 season with 46 points, never being in the relegation zone all season, and with the signing of Christian Eriksen the team won 7 of their last 11 games. They have since remained in the Premier League, with their highest finish being ninth in the 2022-23 and 2025-26 seasons, in both cases finishing above their West London rivals Chelsea, and narrowly missing out on Europe due to other results going against them on the final day of the season.

In 2022, Fulham returned to the top flight after one season in the Championship, finishing 10th in the 2022–23 season, never being in danger of relegation and occupying European places for most of the first half of the season. They eventually became the fourth promoted team in five years to earn at least 50 points. They also won their first West London derby against Chelsea since 2006, with a 2–1 win on 12 January 2023.

In 2025, Sunderland returned to the Premier League after 8 years. They finished 7th in the 2025-26 season with 54 points, never being in danger of relegation and eventually qualified for the 2026–27 UEFA Europa League via league position. They also did the double over their rivals Newcastle United, who did not qualify for Europe. Fellow promoted club Leeds United also comfortably survived relegation after a late run of form, finishing 14th with 47 points.

=== Second season syndrome ===
Second season syndrome is a downturn in form suffered by a team in their second season after promotion, having performed relatively well in their first season. In the Football League, Swansea City were a notable example of this so-called syndrome. Once they got promoted to old Division One in 1981–82 and led the league before finishing 6th, but they were relegated following season and in the next three years they crashed into Division Four and narrowly avoided relegation to the Conference. Swansea City were able to return to top flight only 28 years later, competing in the Premier League until 2017–18. Another notable example was Ipswich Town, who were promoted to the Premier League after a five-year exile and finished fifth in 2000–01, qualifying for the UEFA Cup, but were relegated a year later. In 2005–06, for instance, newly promoted West Ham United and Wigan Athletic finished ninth and tenth in the Premier League (it was Wigan's first season as a top division club) and were runners-up in the FA Cup and Football League Cup respectively. The following season, however, they narrowly avoided relegation with respective 17th and 15th-place finishes. In 2006–07, Reading were playing top division football for the first time in their history and finished eighth in the Premier League, with only a defeat on the final day of the season preventing them from qualifying for the UEFA Cup. A year later, however, a drastic loss of form in the second half of the season saw them dragged from mid-table to occupy the final relegation place, and they were relegated on the last day of the season.

Another example is Birmingham City, who after securing ninth position with over 50 points, were then relegated in 2010–11 after suffering a horrific downturn in form despite claiming the Carling Cup. Indeed, that season saw a surprisingly high number of points claimed by the clubs that went down, with West Ham United finishing bottom with 33 points, which would have secured 17th place the previous year, and Birmingham and shock 'new boys' Blackpool both going down on 39 points. In 2017–18 Huddersfield Town were playing Premier League football for the first time in their history, and top flight football for the first time since 1972 and finished 16th, securing top flight status with 1 game to spare. However, they were relegated next season after winning a mere 3 matches from their first 32 and becoming just the second club ever to be relegated in March (after Derby County). This could in part be attributed to burn out, newly promoted or under resourced clubs lack the strength in depth of larger established teams leaving them more vulnerable to injuries of key players and exhaustion from lack of rotation allowing players to rest. The same can be said about Sheffield United who began the 2020–21 season with just two points from 14 games after finishing 9th the previous season. They got relegated with six games to spare after a 1–0 defeat against Wolverhampton Wanderers. Another example is Leeds United, in the 2021–22 season they finished 9th in their first season back in the top flight after a 16-year absence, getting 59 points along the way, the most for a newly promoted side since Ipswich Town in the 2000–01 season but only managed to beat the drop on the last day of the season in 2021–22, finishing 17th with 38 points, 21 fewer than the previous season.

Second season syndrome is far from guaranteed, however; after surviving their first season back in the Premier League in 2014–15 by six points, Leicester City stunned the football world by winning the Premier League the following season. In addition, in Bournemouth's second season, they managed to finish 9th after a strong performance from them at the end of the season. Furthermore, in Burnley's second season after their third promotion, they managed to finish 7th and qualify for the Europa League — their best in 54 years. Another example is Aston Villa in the 2020–21 season. They only survived by a point in the previous season when they were promoted but finished 11th in 2020–21 with over 50 points thanks to a strong start, including an incredible 7–2 win over defending champions Liverpool. Brentford, with one of the smallest budgets in the division and among the pre-season favorites for relegation after the departure of Eriksen, followed up a stellar debut Premier League campaign in 2021/22 with a ninth-place finish in 2022/23.

== Project Big Picture ==
Project Big Picture was a plan proposed by leading Premier League clubs Manchester United and Liverpool and their owners Joel Glazer and John W. Henry. The plan would have diverted £250 million to support Football League clubs and reduce the size of the Premier League to 18 teams. It was opposed by the Premier League leadership and the UK government's Department for Digital, Culture, Media and Sport.

Tottenham Hotspur expressed support for the plans. It was reported that other Premier League teams had either expressed concerns about the plan or were opposed to it. Despite being one of the teams that would seemingly benefit from the project, it has been said that West Ham United were "very much against" it. Critics of the plan stated that it would put the "Big Six" clubs into a position of control over all of English football. The Daily Telegraph described the plan as a "brazen power grab", and "a hostile takeover spun as a rescue package" by the top clubs. However, the plan was supported by EFL chair Rick Parry and the vast majority of EFL clubs.

In a virtual meeting on 14 October 2020, all 20 Premier League clubs rejected the proposal, but agreed to further financial assistance to League One and League Two teams.

== See also ==
- Doing a Leeds
- Premier League parachute and solidarity payments
