= Leeds Fans Utd =

Leeds Fans Utd Ltd.
- Formerly: Leeds Fans LLP
- Company type: Private limited company
- Industry: Association football
- Founded: 2015
- Headquarters: Leeds, United Kingdom
- Key people: Allan Clarke (footballer); Sharon Reid (CEO); Brendan Meehan (Chairman); Andrew Curtis; Howard Nelson; Philip Robinson; Mike Thornton
- Website: https://www.leedsfansutd.com

Leeds Fans Utd Community Benefit Society Ltd.
- Formation: 2015
- Type: Community benefit society
- Purpose: Purchase a stake in Leeds United F.C. and give supporters a voice in the running of the club
- Location: Leeds, United Kingdom
- Website: https://www.leedsfansutd.com

Leeds Fans Utd is a private limited company which intends to secure a stake in Leeds United F.C. The funding for the project comes from ordinary Leeds fans, who collectively acquire shares in the company through the Leeds Fans Utd Community Benefit Society. If the company is successful in acquiring a stake in the club, the society will be able to have a voice at director level of the Club. If the company cannot acquire a stake, the society will return fans at least 90% of their investment.

The company's Executive team is now led by Sharon Reid, as CEO, and Brendan Meehan, as Chairman At the end of October 2015, it had reached an agreement in principle with Leeds United owner Massimo Cellino to buy a majority stake in the club. When Mr Cellino was asked to commit to an exclusivity period for the deal, he changed his mind.

With over 2,000 members who have committed funding, it was stated at the Leeds Fans CBS Annual General Meeting on 3 December 2016 that the group remains in touch with many parties who have the desire and ability to invest in Leeds United along with LFU immediately or within the medium term; the directors noted that achieving Fan Ownership in Leeds United was always known as being potentially a long term effort (despite early success with Mr Cellino as above) and a resounding 87% of its investors voted, during the summer, to continue with these efforts. New directors joined the board at the AGM.
