= 2017–18 Leeds United F.C. season =

2017–18 season of Leeds United football club

Leeds United
2017–18 season
- Chairman: Andrea Radrizzani
- Head coach: Thomas Christiansen (until 4 February); Paul Heckingbottom (from 6 February)
- Stadium: Elland Road
- Championship: 13th
- FA Cup: Third round
- EFL Cup: Fourth round
- Top goalscorer: League: Kemar Roofe (11); All: Kemar Roofe (14)
- Highest home attendance: 35,337 vs Bolton Wanderers (31 March 2018, Championship)
- Lowest home attendance: 15,431 vs Port Vale (9 August 2017, EFL Cup)
- Average home league attendance: 31,525
Home colours	Away colours

The 2017–18 season saw Leeds United competing in the Championship (known as the Sky Bet Championship for sponsorship reasons) for an eighth successive season.

== Season summary ==
Hopes of improving on Leeds' play-off near-miss the previous season took an early blow when manager Garry Monk left to take over at newly-relegated Middlesbrough, leaving new owner Andrea Radrizzani to appoint Thomas Christiansen as his successor. Their promotion aspirations took another blow when Chris Wood, their top scorer in both of the previous two seasons, refused to sign a new contract and then, a few weeks into the campaign, announced that he would not play for the club again, ultimately resulting in his sale to Premier League Burnley. This, and the injury crisis hanging over from the previous season, forced Christiansen to make a large amount of new signings over the summer, leaving concerns as to whether or not the team could gel quickly enough.

Despite all this, the club had what, in the early stages at least, was an even better campaign than the previous one, with the club topping the Championship for the early months of the season. A slump in form in October was turned around in the following months, and Leeds entered the new year looking in a strong position to challenge for promotion. However, a failure to win any games in January (including a humiliating FA Cup exit to League Two side Newport County), combined with rumours of unrest in the dressing room, saw Christiansen sacked at the start of February, and replaced by Paul Heckingbottom, manager of Yorkshire rivals Barnsley. If anything, however, the loss of form that had started under Christiansen accelerated under Heckingbottom, and Leeds only won four more games all season, two of them coming in the last three matches alone, leaving Leeds with the unenviable record of having earned fewer points than any team except for bottom-placed Sunderland after Christmas. Many fans were left disillusioned by this turn of events, convinced that the previous season had been a false dawn, and that Leeds were back to the pattern of mid-table mediocrity with occasional struggles against relegation that had mostly marked the 2010s.

== First-team squad ==
=== Squad information ===
N	Pos.	Nat.	Name	Age	Since	App	Goals	Ends	Transfer fee	Notes
1	GK	(Republic of Ireland) (England)	Andy Lonergan	34	2011; 2017	48	0	2012; 2019	Free	
2	DF	(England)	Luke Ayling	26	2016	79	0	2021	£750,000	
4	MF	(England)	Adam Forshaw	26	2018	5	0	2022	£4,500,000	
5	DF	(England)	Matthew Pennington	23	2017	15	0	2018	Loan	On loan from Everton
6	DF	(Scotland) (England)	Liam Cooper	26	2014	122	3	2021	£600,000	Team captain
7	MF	(England)	Kemar Roofe	25	2016	87	17	2020	£3,000,000	
8	MF	(Netherlands) (Netherlands Antilles)	Vurnon Anita	29	2017	23	0	2020	Free	
9	FW	(Germany)	Pierre-Michel Lasogga	26	2017	30	13	2018	Loan	On loan from Hamburg
10	MF	(North Macedonia)	Ezgjan Alioski	26	2017	41	7	2021	£3,200,000	
11	FW	(Netherlands)	Jay-Roy Grot	20	2017	22	0	2021	£750,000	
12	FW	(Sweden)	Marcus Antonsson	27	2016	21	3	2019	£1,600,000	On loan to Blackburn Rovers
12	LB	(Belgium)	Laurens De Bock	25	2018	6	0	2022	£1,500,000	
13	GK	(Germany)	Felix Wiedwald	28	2017	34	0	2020	£500,000	
14	MF	(Republic of Ireland) (Northern Ireland)	Eunan O'Kane	27	2016	57	0	2021	£1,000,000	
15	MF	(Northern Ireland)	Stuart Dallas	27	2015	113	11	2020	£1,300,000	
17	FW	(Wales) (England)	Tyler Roberts	19	2018	0	0	2022	£2,500,000	
18	DF	(Sweden)	Pontus Jansson	27	2016	71	5	2020	£3,600,000	
19	MF	(Spain)	Pablo Hernández	33	2016	77	14	2018	Free	
21	MF	(Spain)	Samuel Sáiz	27	2017	32	10	2021	£3,100,000	
22	FW	(Sweden)	Paweł Cibicki	24	2017	11	0	2021	£1,500,000	
23	MF	(England)	Kalvin Phillips	22	2014	90	9	2021	Youth system	
24	FW	(France)	Hadi Sacko	24	2016	56	8	2020	£1,600,000	
25	MF	(England) (Guinea-Bissau)	Ronaldo Vieira	19	2016	64	2	2021	Youth system	
28	DF	(Switzerland)	Gaetano Berardi	29	2014	111	1	2020	£250,000	
29	MF	(Spain)	Madger Gomes	21	2017	2	0	2020	Free	
30	GK	(England)	Bailey Peacock-Farrell	21	2015	1	0	2020	Youth system	
31	DF	(England)	Lewie Coyle	22	2014	23	0	2020	Youth system	On loan to Fleetwood Town
33	DF	(England)	Tyler Denton	22	2016	3	1	2020	Youth system	
35	MF	(Republic of Ireland)	Conor Shaughnessy	22	2017	17	0	2021	Youth system	
36	FW	(England)	Mallik Wilks	19	2017	1	0	2019	Youth system	On loan to Grimsby Town
37	DF	(Republic of Ireland)	Paudie O'Connor	20	2017	0	0	2019	Youth system	
43	MF	(Poland)	Mateusz Klich	28	2017	11	0	2020	£1,500,000	On loan to Utrecht
40	MF	(Guinea-Bissau)	Romario Vieira	19	2018	0	0	2018	Youth system	
45	FW	(Ghana) (Italy)	Caleb Ekuban	24	2017	10	1	2021	£500,000	
46	DF	(England)	Tom Pearce	20	2018	0	0	2018	Youth system	
47	FW	(England)	Jack Clarke	17	2018	0	0	2021	Youth system	
48	DF	(England)	Liam Kitching	18	2018	0	0	2019	Youth system	
49	DF	(Spain)	Oriol Rey	20	2018	0	0	2019	Youth system	
	MF	(Netherlands)	Ouasim Bouy	25	2017	0	0	2021	Free	
	MF	(England)	Luke Murphy	28	2013	111	7	2019	£1,000,000	On loan to Burton Albion
	MF	(Japan)	Yosuke Ideguchi	21	2018	0	0	2022	£500,000	On loan to Cultural Leonesa

- Last updated: 1 March 2018
- Source: Players' wikipedia articles, Leeds United
- Ordered by squad number.

Appearances (starts and substitute appearances) and goals include those in the Championship (and playoffs), League One (and playoffs), FA Cup, League Cup and Football League Trophy.

== Transfers ==
=== In ===
Date	Pos.	Name	From	Fee	Ref.
1 July 2017	MF	Madger Gomes	Liverpool	Free	
1 July 2017	DF	Pontus Jansson	Torino	£3,600,000	
1 July 2017	MF	Mateusz Klich	FC Twente	£1,500,000	
1 July 2017	FW	Hadi Sacko	Sporting CP	£1,600,000	
1 July 2017	GK	Felix Wiedwald	Werder Bremen	£500,000	
6 July 2017	MF	Vurnon Anita	Newcastle United	Free	
11 July 2017	FW	Caleb Ekuban	Chievo Verona	£500,000	
13 July 2017	MF	Samuel Sáiz	SD Huesca	£3,100,000	
13 July 2017	MF	Ezgjan Alioski	FC Lugano	£3,200,000	
2 August 2017	MF	Ouasim Bouy	Juventus	Free	
23 August 2017	FW	Jay-Roy Grot	NEC Nijmegen	£750,000	
27 August 2017	GK	Andy Lonergan	Wolverhampton Wanderers	Free	
31 August 2017	FW	Adrián Balboa	UD Unificacion Bellvitge	Free	
31 August 2017	FW	Paweł Cibicki	Malmö	£1,500,000	
31 August 2017	MF	Hugo Díaz	SD Huesca	Free	
31 August 2017	DF	Bryce Hosannah	Crystal Palace	Free	
31 August 2017	MF	Alejandro Machuca	Rayo Vallecano	Free	
31 August 2017	DF	Oriol Rey	Barcelona	Free	
31 August 2017	FW	Ousama Siddiki	Real Madrid	Free	
31 August 2017	FW	Kun Temenuzhkov	Barcelona	Undisclosed	
15 November 2017	FW	Ryan Edmondson	York City	Undisclosed	
3 January 2018	DF	Aapo Halme	HJK Helsinki	Undisclosed	
9 January 2018	MF	Yosuke Ideguchi	Gamba Osaka	£500,000	
11 January 2018	DF	Laurens De Bock	Club Brugge	£1,500,000	
11 January 2018	FW	Oliver Sarkic	Benfica	Undisclosed	
18 January 2018	MF	Adam Forshaw	Middlesbrough	£4,500,000	
23 January 2018	FW	Sam Dalby	Leyton Orient	Undisclosed	
29 January 2018	DF	Pascal Struijk	Ajax	Undisclosed	
31 January 2018	FW	Tyler Roberts	West Brom	£2,500,000	
31 January 2018	MF	Jordan Stevens	Forest Green	Undisclosed	

=== Transfers out ===
Date from	Position	Name	To	Fee	Ref.
1 July 2017	MF	Jordan Botaka	Sint-Truiden	Free	(Note: Jordan Botaka joined Sint-Truiden following his release.)
1 July 2017	MF	Alex Purver	Guiseley	Free	(Note: Alex Purver joined Guiseley following his release.)
1 July 2017	DF	Charlie Taylor	Burnley	£6,000,000 (compensation)	(Note: Charlie Taylor joined Burnley following his departure. Burnley subsequently paid Leeds between £6m and £7m in compensation since Taylor was under 24.)
1 July 2017	GK	Ross Turnbull	Free agent	Released	
1 July 2017	DF	Jack Vann	Harrogate Town	Free	
1 July 2017	MF	Billy Whitehouse	Tadcaster Albion	Free	(Note: Billy Whitehouse joined Alfreton Town following his release.)
18 July 2017	DF	Giuseppe Bellusci	US Palermo	Free	
19 July 2017	GK	Marco Silvestri	Hellas Verona	Undisclosed	
28 July 2017	FW	Lee Erwin	Kilmarnock	Undisclosed	
21 August 2017	FW	Chris Wood	Burnley	£15,000,000	(Note: The fee paid for Wood could rise to £18m depending on appearances.)
22 August 2017	MF	Liam Bridcutt	Nottingham Forest	£1,000,000	
23 August 2017	FW	Souleymane Doukara	Osmanlıspor	Free	
25 August 2017	MF	Toumani Diagouraga	Plymouth Argyle	Free	(Note: Toumani Diagouraga joined Plymouth Argyle following his departure.)
27 August 2017	GK	Robert Green	Huddersfield Town	Free	(Note: Robert Green joined Huddersfield Town following his departure.)
17 December 2017	FW	Jack McKay	Free agent	Released	
17 December 2017	DF	Paul McKay	Free agent	Released	
1 February 2018	MF	Eoghan Stokes	Free agent	Released	

=== Loans in ===
Start date	Position	Name	From	End date	Ref.
19 July 2017	DF	Matthew Pennington	Everton	30 June 2018	
7 August 2017	DF	Cameron Borthwick-Jackson	Manchester United	16 January 2018	
31 August 2017	FW	Pierre-Michel Lasogga	Hamburg	30 June 2018	
8 September 2017	FW	Oliver Sarkic	Benfica	31 December 2017	

=== Loans out ===
Start date	Position	Name	To	End date	Ref.
3 July 2017	MF	Luke Murphy	Burton Albion	30 June 2018	
4 July 2017	DF	Lewie Coyle	Fleetwood Town	30 June 2018	
2 August 2017	MF	Ouasim Bouy	Cultural Leonesa	3 January 2018	
7 August 2017	DF	Tyler Denton	Port Vale	3 January 2018	
11 August 2017	FW	Marcus Antonsson	Blackburn Rovers	30 June 2018	
24 August 2017	FW	Mallik Wilks	Accrington Stanley	3 January 2018	
12 October 2017	GK	Bailey Peacock-Farrell	York City	9 November 2017	
9 January 2018	MF	Yosuke Ideguchi	Cultural Leonesa	30 June 2018	
22 January 2018	MF	Mateusz Klich	Utrecht	30 June 2018	
26 January 2018	FW	Mallik Wilks	Grimsby Town	30 June 2018	

== Pre-season ==
Leeds United had announced six pre-season friendlies against Harrogate Town, Guiseley, North Ferriby United, Borussia Mönchengladbach, Oxford United and Eibar. Another friendly was scheduled against Ingolstadt, which was cancelled by local government officials in Kufstein, Austria. Instead, the club arranged a behind-closed-doors friendly in Italy with Bursaspor. The Turkish team divulged details and a video of the match to the public.

5 July 2017	Leeds United	4–2	Harrogate Town	Wetherby
15:00 BST	Roofe 16' (pen.); Gomes 33'; Hernández 50'; Erwin 87'	Report	Thewlis 75'; Pollock 83'	Stadium: Thorp Arch; Attendance: 0

8 July 2017	Guiseley	1–5	Leeds United	Guiseley
15:00 BST	Trialist 28'	Report	Dallas 1', 27'; Antonsson 33'; Erwin 58', 89'	Stadium: Nethermoor Park

12 July 2017	North Ferriby United	0–2	Leeds United	North Ferriby
19:30 BST		Report	Antonsson 18'; Roofe 55'	Stadium: Grange Lane

17 July 2017	Leeds United	0–3	Bursaspor	Natz-Schabs, Italy
17:15 BST		Report	Ekong 11'; Necid 63'; Bakış 82'

20 July 2017	Borussia Mönchengladbach	1–1	Leeds United	Schwaz, Austria
14:15 CEST	Herrmann 47'	Report	Ayling 2'	Stadium: Silberstadt Arena

23 July 2017	Eibar	4–2	Leeds United	Jenbach, Austria
17:00 CEST	Sarriegi 5'; Arbilla 26'; Enrich 43'; Oliveira 88'	Report	Wood 63'; Alioski 73'	Stadium: Jenbach Stadium

29 July 2017	Leeds United	2–0	Oxford United	Leeds
15:00 BST	Roofe 35'; Dallas 84'	Report		Stadium: Elland Road; Attendance: 13,295

=== Post-season ===
On 24 April, Leeds United announced a post-season tour of Myanmar.

9 May 2018	MNL All-Stars	2–1	Leeds United	Yangon, Myanmar
12:30 BST	Mpande 22'; Chizoba 64' (pen.)	Report	Sáiz 26' (pen.)	Stadium: Thuwunna Stadium; Attendance: 16,910

11 May 2018	Myanmar national team	0–2	Leeds United	Mandalay, Myanmar
12:30 BST		Report	Edmondson 59'; Grot 84'	Stadium: Mandalarthiri Stadium

== Competitions ==
=== Championship ===
==== League table ====
Pos	Team	Pld	W	D	L	GF	GA	GD	Pts
11	Bristol City	46	17	16	13	67	58	+9	67
12	Ipswich Town	46	17	9	20	57	60	−3	60
13	Leeds United	46	17	9	20	59	64	−5	60
14	Norwich City	46	15	15	16	49	60	−11	60
15	Sheffield Wednesday	46	14	15	17	59	60	−1	57

Source: English Football League
Rules for classification: 1) Points; 2) Goal difference; 3) Number of goals scored

==== Result summary ====
Overall								Home						Away					
Pld	W	D	L	GF	GA	GD	Pts	W	D	L	GF	GA	GD	W	D	L	GF	GA	GD
46	17	9	20	59	64	−5	60	10	6	7	32	27	+5	7	3	13	27	37	−10

Last updated: 3 April 2018.

==== Results by matchday ====
Matchday	1	2	3	4	5	6	7	8	9	10	11	12	13	14	15	16	17	18	19	20	21	22	23	24	25	26	27	28	29	30	31	32	33	34	35	36	37	38	39	40	41	42	43	44	45	46
Ground	A	H	H	A	A	H	H	A	H	A	A	H	A	H	H	A	H	A	A	H	A	H	H	A	A	H	A	H	A	H	A	H	A	H	A	H	A	H	H	A	H	A	A	H	A	H
Result	W	D	D	W	W	W	W	L	W	L	L	L	W	L	L	L	W	L	W	D	W	W	W	W	L	D	L	L	D	L	L	D	D	W	L	L	D	L	W	L	D	L	L	W	L	W
Position	3	8	7	5	3	2	1	1	1	3	5	6	4	4	6	10	7	10	8	8	7	7	5	5	5	6	7	10	10	10	11	11	11	10	11	13	13	14	14	14	14	14	14	12	12	13

Updated to match(es) played on 3 April 2018. Source: Statto.com
A = Away; H = Home; W = Win; D = Draw; L = Loss

==== Matches ====
On 21 June, the Championship fixtures were released.

6 August 2017 1	Bolton Wanderers	2–3	Leeds United	Horwich
16:30 BST	Madine 39'; Le Fondre 67' (pen.); Buckley (yellow card) 90+3'	Report	Phillips 7', 42'; Wood 30'	Stadium: Macron Stadium; Attendance: 19,857 (4,832 away); Referee: Simon Hooper

12 August 2017 2	Leeds United	0–0	Preston North End	Leeds
15:00 BST	Vieira (yellow card) 74'	Report	Pearson (yellow card) 31' (yellow-red card) 60'; Cunningham (yellow card) 68'	Stadium: Elland Road; Attendance: 32,880 (697 away); Referee: Scott Duncan

15 August 2017 3	Leeds United	0–0	Fulham	Leeds
19:45 BST	Phillips (yellow card) 65'; Anita (yellow card) 83'	Report	Sessegnon (yellow card) 49'	Stadium: Elland Road; Attendance: 28,918 (576 away); Referee: Darren Bond

19 August 2017 4	Sunderland	0–2	Leeds United	Sunderland
17:30 BST	Galloway (yellow card) 36'; Lamine Koné (yellow card) 69'; Ndong (yellow card) 82'	Report	Sáiz 21'; Dallas 76'; Wiedwald (yellow card) 68'	Stadium: Stadium of Light; Attendance: 31,237 (2,900 away); Referee: Andy Davies

26 August 2017 5	Nottingham Forest	0–2	Leeds United	West Bridgford
15:00 BST	Mills (yellow card) 49'; Bridcutt (yellow card) 56'; Dowell (yellow card) 86'	Report	Roofe 24'; Alioski 87'; Hernández (yellow card) 59'; Ayling (yellow card) 82'	Stadium: City Ground; Attendance: 25,682 (1,993 away); Referee: Jeremy Simpson

9 September 2017 6	Leeds United	5–0	Burton Albion	Leeds
15:00 BST	Lasogga 20', 59'; Phillips 35'; Hernández 44'; Roofe 54'	Report	McFadzean (yellow card) 34'	Stadium: Elland Road; Attendance: 33,404 (372 away); Referee: Oliver Langford

12 September 2017 7	Leeds United	2–0	Birmingham City	Leeds
19:45 BST	Sáiz 17'; Phillips (yellow card) 79'; Dallas 90+2'	Report	Gallagher (yellow card) 53'; Lowe (yellow card) 73'; Morrison (yellow card) 90+3'	Stadium: Elland Road; Attendance: 31,507 (612 away); Referee: Peter Bankes

16 September 2017 8	Millwall	1–0	Leeds United	Bermondsey, London
15:00 BST	Saville (yellow card) 61'; O'Brien 73'	Report	Shaughnessy (yellow card) 43'; Sáiz (yellow card) 47'; O'Kane (yellow card) 69'	Stadium: The Den; Attendance: 16,447 (2,156 away); Referee: Tim Robinson

23 September 2017 9	Leeds United	3–2	Ipswich Town	Leeds
15:00 BST	Lasogga 13'; Phillips 32'; Białkowski 67' (o.g.); Cooper (yellow card) 72'	Report	Spence (yellow card) 3'; McGoldrick 30'; Knudsen (yellow card) 37'; Garner 71'	Stadium: Elland Road; Attendance: 34,002 (693 away); Referee: Geoff Eltringham

26 September 2017 10	Cardiff City	3–1	Leeds United	Cardiff
19:45 BST	Zohore 28', 59'; Hoilett 37'	Report	Phillips (yellow card) 23'; Cooper (yellow card) 39' (yellow-red card) 45+3'; Roofe 67'	Stadium: Cardiff City Stadium; Attendance: 27,190 (2,744 away); Referee: Kevin Friend
Note: Live on Sky TV

1 October 2017 11	Sheffield Wednesday	3–0	Leeds United	Sheffield
12:15 BST	Hooper 25', 41'; Lee 82'; Palmer (yellow card) 90+5'	Report		Stadium: Hillsborough Stadium; Attendance: 27,972 (4,600 away); Referee: Andrew Madley

14 October 2017 12	Leeds United	0–1	Reading	Leeds
15:00 BST	Sáiz (yellow card) 29'; O'Kane (yellow card) 35'; Berardi (yellow card) 59'; Hernández (yellow card) 85'; Ayling (yellow card) 86'	Report	van den Berg (yellow card) 53'; Barrow 84' (yellow card) 85'	Stadium: Elland Road; Attendance: 33,900 (434 away); Referee: Jeremy Simpson

21 October 2017 13	Bristol City	0–3	Leeds United	Bristol
15:00 BST	Hegeler (yellow card) 65'; Wright (yellow card) 75'; Taylor (red card) 80'; Reid (yellow card) 82'	Report	Sáiz 4', 14'; Pennington (yellow card) 35'; Vieira (yellow card) 53'; Lasogga 67'; Berardi (red card) 79'; Phillips (yellow card) 82'	Stadium: Ashton Gate; Attendance: 24,435 (3,717 away); Referee: Andy Madley

27 October 2017 14	Leeds United	1–2	Sheffield United	Leeds
19:45 BST	Phillips 34' (yellow card) 62'; Ronaldo Vieira (yellow card) 87'	Report	Sharp 2'; Stevens (yellow card) 45'; Coutts (yellow card) 51'; O'Connell (yellow card) 60'; Baldock (yellow card) 74'; Brooks 81'; Clarke (yellow card) 82'; Fleck (yellow card) 84'	Stadium: Elland Road; Attendance: 34,504 (2,783 away); Referee: Scott Duncan

31 October 2017 15	Leeds United	1–2	Derby County	Leeds
19:45 GMT	Lasogga 7'; Sáiz (yellow card) 82'; Jansson (yellow card) 83'	Report	Keogh (yellow card) 45'; Winnall 72', 80' (pen.); Huddlestone (yellow card) 87'	Stadium: Elland Road; Attendance: 28,565 (852 away); Referee: Simon Hooper

4 November 2017 16	Brentford	3–1	Leeds United	Brentford, London
17:30 GMT	Maupay 22'; Watkins (yellow card) 45+3'; Yennaris (yellow card) 68'; Barbet 85' (yellow card) 90'; Woods 90+3'	Report	O'Kane (yellow card) 45+3'; Alioski 67'; Sáiz (yellow card) 90'	Stadium: Griffin Park; Attendance: 11,068 (539 away); Referee: Stuart Attwell

19 November 2017 17	Leeds United	2–1	Middlesbrough	Leeds
13:15 GMT	Hernández 25' (yellow card) 90+2'; Berardi (yellow card) 33'; Jansson (yellow card) 34'; Alioski 54'; Ayling (yellow card) 76'; Phillips (yellow card) 87'	Report	Friend (yellow card) 30'; Howson (yellow card) 61'; Assombalona 78' (pen.) (yellow card) 86'	Stadium: Elland Road; Attendance: 33,771 (2,565 away); Referee: Keith Stroud

22 November 2017 18	Wolverhampton Wanderers	4–1	Leeds United	Wolverhampton
19:45 GMT	Douglas 15'; Cavaleiro 26'; Jota 72'; Costa 76' (pen.)	Report	Vieira (yellow card) 28' (yellow-red card) 60'; Alioski 48' (yellow card) 62'; Phillips (yellow card) 51'	Stadium: Molineux Stadium; Attendance: 28,914 (2,370 away); Referee: Geoff Eltringham

25 November 2017 19	Barnsley	0–2	Leeds United	Barnsley
12:15 GMT	Barnes (yellow card) 15'; Gardner (yellow card) 48'; Hammill (yellow card) 75'	Report	Jansson (yellow card) 3'; Ayling (yellow card) 15'; Sáiz 23'; Alioski 45+4'; Hernández (yellow card) 53'	Stadium: Oakwell; Attendance: 16,399 (4,513 away); Referee: Andy Madley

1 December 2017 20	Leeds United	1–1	Aston Villa	Leeds
19:45 GMT	Jansson 19' (yellow card) 74'; Sáiz (yellow card) 77'	Report	Hourihane (yellow card) 28'; Snodgrass (yellow card) 45+2'; Lansbury 71'; Hutton (yellow card) 90+2'	Stadium: Elland Road; Attendance: 30,547 (2,443 away); Referee: Peter Bankes

9 December 2017 21	Queens Park Rangers	1–3	Leeds United	Shepherd's Bush, London
15:00 GMT	Scowen (yellow card) 20'; Luongo (yellow card) 55'; Wszolek 90'	Report	Phillips (yellow card) 29'; Vieira (yellow card) 56'; Alioski (yellow card) 60'; Roofe 63', 68', 90+4'	Stadium: Loftus Road; Attendance: 15,506 (3,149 away); Referee: Chris Kavanagh

16 December 2017 22	Leeds United	1–0	Norwich City	Leeds
15:00 GMT	Jansson 41'; Vieira (yellow card) 61'; Cooper (yellow card) 68'; Jansson (yellow card) 69'	Report	Oliveira (yellow card) 69'; Hanley (yellow card) 90+1'	Stadium: Elland Road; Attendance: 30,590 (997 away); Referee: Darren England

23 December 2017 23	Leeds United	1–0	Hull City	Leeds
15:00 GMT	Hernández 29'	Report	Dawson (yellow card) 82'; Hector (yellow card) 89'	Stadium: Elland Road; Attendance: 35,156 (1,794 away); Referee: Steve Martin

26 December 2017 24	Burton Albion	1–2	Leeds United	Burton upon Trent
15:00 GMT	Naylor 29'; Naylor (yellow card) 50'; Bywater (yellow card) 60'; Flanagan (yellow card) 63'	Report	Berardi (yellow card) 45+2'; Cooper (yellow card) 58'; Hernández 61'; Roofe 64'	Stadium: Pirelli Stadium; Attendance: 5,612 (1,656 away); Referee: Darren Bond

30 December 2017 25	Birmingham City	1–0	Leeds United	Birmingham
15:00 GMT	Grounds (yellow card) 65'; Maghoma 83'	Report	Cooper (yellow card) 50'; Roofe (yellow card) 57'	Stadium: St Andrew's; Attendance: 21,637 (2,484 away); Referee: Tim Robinson

1 January 2018 26	Leeds United	0–0	Nottingham Forest	Leeds
15:00 GMT	Jansson (yellow card) 45'; Sáiz (yellow card) 90'	Report	Lichaj (yellow card) 69'; Carayol (yellow card) 85'	Stadium: Elland Road; Attendance: 32,426 (917 away); Referee: Jeremy Simpson

13 January 2018 27	Ipswich Town	1–0	Leeds United	Ipswich
15:00 GMT	Connolly (yellow card) 55'; Iorfa (yellow card) 60'; Celina 67'	Report	O'Kane (red card) 37'; Jansson (yellow card) 80'; Phillips (yellow card) 87'	Stadium: Portman Road; Attendance: 18,638 (3,537 away); Referee: Robert Jones

20 January 2018 28	Leeds United	3–4	Millwall	Leeds
15:00 GMT	Cooper (red card) 37'; Jansson (yellow card) 41'; Lasogga 46', 62'; Roofe 55'; Ezgjan Alioski (yellow card) 58'; Phillips (yellow card) 86'	Report	O'Brien 18'; Gregory 42'; Hutchinson (yellow card) 51'; Elliott 87' (yellow card) 90'; Wallace 90+2'	Stadium: Elland Road; Attendance: 33,564 (1,285 away); Referee: David Coote

30 January 2018 29	Hull City	0–0	Leeds United	Kingston upon Hull
19:45 GMT	Henriksen (yellow card) 42'; Aina (yellow card) 44'; Irvine (yellow card) 62'; Mazuch (yellow card) 65'; Campbell (yellow card) 90'	Report	Jansson (yellow card) 31'	Stadium: KCOM Stadium; Attendance: 17,237 (2,097 away); Referee: Tony Harrington

3 February 2018 30	Leeds United	1–4	Cardiff City	Leeds
15:00 GMT	Berardi (yellow card) 26' (yellow-red card) 45+4'; Bamba 54' (o.g.)	Report	Paterson 9'; Madine (yellow card) 35'; Hoilett 41'; Ralls (yellow card) 45+1'; Morrison 45+5'; Pilkington (yellow card) 79'; Grujić (yellow card) 81'; Pilkington 88'	Stadium: Elland Road; Attendance: 30,534 (624 away); Referee: Graham Scott

10 February 2018 31	Sheffield United	2–1	Leeds United	Sheffield
12:30 GMT	Sharp 2', (yellow card) 14', (goal) 73' (pen.); Evans (yellow card) 44'; Fleck (yellow card) 90+2'	Report	Forshaw (yellow card) 5'; Roofe (yellow card) 19'; Lasogga 47'	Stadium: Bramall Lane; Attendance: 27,553 (2,236 away); Referee: Andrew Madley

18 February 2018 32	Leeds United	2–2	Bristol City	Leeds
16:30 GMT	Pennington (yellow card) 44'; Lasogga 72'; Phillips (yellow card) 75'; Roofe 80'	Report	Diedhiou 11'; Reid 16'; Wright (yellow card) 55'; Brownhill (yellow card) 79'; Pack (yellow card) 86'	Stadium: Elland Road; Attendance: 28,004 (536 away); Referee: Simon Hooper

21 February 2018 33	Derby County	2–2	Leeds United	Derby
19:45 GMT	Weimann 45+2'; Palmer 90+2'	Report	Lasogga 34'; Vieira (yellow card) 39'; Alioski 79'	Stadium: Pride Park Stadium; Attendance: 27,934 (3,152 away); Referee: Keith Stroud

24 February 2018 34	Leeds United	1–0	Brentford	Leeds
15:00 GMT	Anita (yellow card) 23'; Alioski (yellow card) 24'; Cooper 31'	Report	Sawyers (yellow card) 45+3'; Woods (yellow card) 53'; Egan (yellow card) 73'; Barbet (yellow card) 80'	Stadium: Elland Road; Attendance: 28,428 (539 away); Referee: Oliver Langford

2 March 2018 35	Middlesbrough	3–0	Leeds United	Middlesbrough
19:45 GMT	Bamford 31', 36', 68'; Leadbitter (yellow card) 34'	Report	Sáiz (yellow card) 34'; Anita (yellow card) 41'; Cooper (yellow card) 73'	Stadium: Riverside Stadium; Attendance: (2,987 away); Referee: Darren England

7 March 2018 36	Leeds United	0–3	Wolverhampton Wanderers	Leeds
19:45 GMT	Forshaw (yellow card) 22'; Hernández (yellow card) 64'	Report	Saïss 28'; Boly 45'; Afobe 74'	Stadium: Elland Road; Attendance: 26,434 (1,356 away); Referee: Tim Robinson

10 March 2018 37	Reading	2–2	Leeds United	Reading
15:00 GMT	Böðvarsson 16'; Evans (yellow card) 24'; Kelly (yellow card) 31'; O'Kane 58' (o.g.)	Report	Jansson 43'; Pennington (yellow card) 48'; Hernández 56'	Stadium: Madejski Stadium; Attendance: 19,770 (3,467 away); Referee: Scott Duncan

17 March 2018 38	Leeds United	1–2	Sheffield Wednesday	Leeds
15:00 GMT	Grot 86'	Report	Nuhiu (yellow card) 13', (goal) 71', 90+1'; Hutchinson (yellow card) 63'; Reach (yellow card) 74'; Wildsmith (yellow card) 90'	Stadium: Elland Road; Attendance: 31,638 (2,039 away); Referee: Keith Stroud

30 March 2018 39	Leeds United	2–1	Bolton Wanderers	Leeds
15:00 BST	Ekuban 4'; Dallas (yellow card) 28'; Hernández 50'; Jansson (yellow card) 90+4'	Report	Le Fondre 53'; Osede (yellow card) 90+1'; Wilbraham (yellow card) 90+4'	Stadium: Elland Road; Attendance: 35,377 (2,480 away); Referee: Geoff Eltringham

3 April 2018 40	Fulham	2–0	Leeds United	Fulham
19:45 BST	McDonald 33', (yellow card) 69'; Mitrović 63'; Bettinelli (yellow card) 68'; Johansen (yellow card) 78'	Report	Jansson (yellow card) 43'; Phillips (yellow card) 90'	Stadium: Craven Cottage; Attendance: 21,538 (4,500 away); Referee: Peter Bankes

7 April 2018 41	Leeds United	1–1	Sunderland	Leeds
15:00 BST	Hernández 72'; O'Connor (yellow card) 75'; Alioski (yellow card) 83'; Berardi (red card) 90'; Jansson (yellow card) 90+1'	Report	Honeyman (yellow card) 12'; McNair 48'; Koné (yellow card) 70'; McManaman (yellow card) 90+1'	Stadium: Elland Road; Attendance: 30,461 (2,486 away); Referee: Jeremy Simpson

10 April 2018 42	Preston North End	3–1	Leeds United	Preston
	Davies (yellow card) 47'; Gallagher 49' (pen.); Maguire 52'; Browne (yellow card) 60', (goal) 82'; Clarke (yellow card) 78'	Report	Roofe 13'; O'Connor (yellow card) 63'; Ekuban (yellow card) 90'	Stadium: Deepdale; Attendance: 14,188 (3,550 away); Referee: Lee Probert

13 April 2018 43	Aston Villa	1–0	Leeds United	Birmingham
19:45 BST	Grabban 29'	Report		Stadium: Villa Park; Attendance: 33,374 (2,288 away); Referee: Tony Harrington

21 April 2018 44	Leeds United	2–1	Barnsley	Leeds
19:45 BST	Pearce 17'; Vieira (yellow card) 31'; Alioski 50'	Report	O'Connor 36' (o.g.); Hammill (yellow card) 87'	Stadium: Elland Road; Attendance: 30,451 (1,583 away); Referee: Steve Martin

28 April 2018 45	Norwich City	2–1	Leeds United	Norwich
15:00 BST	Hanley (yellow card) 33'; Hoolahan 45'; Murphy 69'	Report	Phillips 39'; Pennington (yellow card) 43'; Jansson (yellow card) 90+5'	Stadium: Carrow Road; Attendance: 26,869 (2,400 away); Referee: John Brooks

6 May 2018 46	Leeds United	2–0	Queens Park Rangers	Leeds
12:30 BST	Roofe 30'; Phillips 47' (yellow card) 86'; Alioski (yellow card) 54'; Edmonson (yellow card) 81'	Report	Furlong (yellow card) 63'; Scowen (yellow card) 84'; Bidwell (yellow card) 90+1'	Stadium: Elland Road; Attendance: 30,004 (647 away); Referee: Darren England

=== FA Cup ===
Leeds United were drawn away to Newport County in the third round.

7 January 2018 Third round	Newport County	2–1	Leeds United	Newport
12:00 UTC	Shaughnessy 76' (o.g.); McCoulsky 89' (yellow card) 90'	Report	Berardi 9' (yellow card) 10'; Grot (yellow card) 67'; Saiz (red card) 90'	Stadium: Rodney Parade; Attendance: 6,887; Referee: Mike Dean

=== EFL Cup ===
Leeds United were drawn at home against Port Vale in the first round, at home against Newport County in the second round, away to Burnley in the third round and away to Leicester City in the fourth round.

9 August 2017 First round	Leeds United	4–1	Port Vale	Leeds
19:45 BST	Sáiz 13', 60', 62'; Klich (yellow card) 40'; Ekuban 83'	Report	Tonge 36'; Gunning (red card) 88'	Stadium: Elland Road; Attendance: 15,431; Referee: Peter Bankes

22 August 2017 Second round	Leeds United	5–1	Newport County	Leeds
19:45 BST	Roofe 44', 49', 65'; Sáiz 78'; Vieira 89'; Gomes (yellow card) 38'; Vieira (yellow card) 45+1'; Klich (yellow card) 73'; Dallas (yellow card) 73'; Cooper (yellow card) 90+1'	Report	Labadie 33'; Labadie (yellow card) 37'; Quigley (yellow card) 72'; Dolan (yellow card) 79'; O'Brien (yellow card) 90+4'	Stadium: Elland Road; Attendance: 17,098; Referee: Ross Joyce

19 September 2017 Third round	Burnley	2–2 (a.e.t.) (3–5 p)	Leeds United	Burnley
19:45 BST	Bardsley (yellow card) 52'; Guðmundsson (yellow card) 70'; Long (yellow card) 85'; Wood 89' (pen.); Brady 90+6'	Report	Grot (yellow card) 45'; Roofe (yellow card) 58'; Sacko 80'; Hernández 90+3' (pen.)	Stadium: Turf Moor; Attendance: 11,799; Referee: Darren Bond
	Penalties
	Wood (penalty scored); Barnes (penalty scored); Brady (penalty scored); Tarkowski (penalty missed)		Lasogga (penalty scored); Hernández (penalty scored); Klich (penalty scored); Alioski (penalty scored); Dallas (penalty scored)

24 October 2017 Fourth round	Leicester City	3–1	Leeds United	Leicester
19:45 BST	Iheanacho 30'; Slimani 70'; Mahrez 88'	Report	Hernández 26'	Stadium: King Power Stadium; Attendance: 31,516; Referee: Lee Probert

== Statistics ==
=== Appearances ===
				Total				Championship		FA Cup		EFL Cup		
N	Pos.	Name	Nat.	GS	App	Gls	Min	App	Gls	App	Gls	App	Gls	Notes
1	GK	Andy Lonergan	(Republic of Ireland) (England)	9	9		840	7		1		1		
1	GK	Robert Green	(England)	1	1		90					1		left club 27 August 2017
2	DF	Luke Ayling	(England)	29	30		2601	26				4		
3	DF	Cameron Borthwick-Jackson	(England)	5	6		427	1		1		4		left club 16 January 2018
4	MF	Adam Forshaw	(England)	5	5		450	5						
5	DF	Matthew Pennington	(England)	8	15		795	15						
6	DF	Liam Cooper	(Scotland) (England)	26	28	1	2245	26	1	1		1		
7	FW	Kemar Roofe	(England)	25	33	12	2252	30	9			3	3	
8	DF	Vurnon Anita	(Netherlands) (Netherlands Antilles)	15	18		1349	14		1		3		
9	FW	Pierre-Michel Lasogga	(Germany)	18	24	10	1618	22	10	1		1		
9	FW	Chris Wood	(New Zealand)	3	3	1	270	3	1					left club 21 August 2017
10	MF	Ezgjan Alioski	(North Macedonia)	30	34	5	2450	31	5			3		
11	FW	Jay-Roy Grot	(Netherlands)	3	17		393	14		1		2		
12	DF	Laurens De Bock	(Belgium)	6	6		540	6						
13	GK	Felix Wiedwald	(Germany)	29	29		2610	27				2		
14	MF	Eunan O'Kane	(Republic of Ireland) (Northern Ireland)	22	26		1885	26						
15	MF	Stuart Dallas	(Northern Ireland)	9	23	2	1173	20	2			3		
18	DF	Pontus Jansson	(Sweden)	31	32	2	2745	31	2			1		
19	MF	Pablo Hernández	(Spain)	26	33	6	2256	31	4			2	2	
21	MF	Samuel Sáiz	(Spain)	22	27	9	2060	24	5	1		2	4	
22	FW	Paweł Cibicki	(Sweden)	8	10		621	7		1		2		
23	MF	Kalvin Phillips	(England)	30	33	5	2630	31	5	1		1		
24	FW	Hadi Sacko	(France)	2	17	1	466	13		1		3	1	
25	MF	Ronaldo Vieira	(England) (Guinea-Bissau)	18	23	1	15921	19				4	1	
26	MF	Liam Bridcutt	(Scotland) (England)		1		32					1		left club 22 August 2017
28	DF	Gaetano Berardi	(Switzerland)	24	26	1	2132	24		1	1	1		
29	MF	Madger Gomes	(Spain)	1	2		110					2		
35	DF	Conor Shaughnessy	(Republic of Ireland)	10	14		956	9		1		4		
38	FW	Eoghan Stokes	(Republic of Ireland)	1	1		66					1		left club 1 February 2018
43	MF	Mateusz Klich	(Poland)	6	9		579	4		1		4		
45	FW	Caleb Ekuban	(Ghana) (Italy)	6	10	1	478	9				1	1	

Last updated: 1 March 2018
Ordered by squad number
0 shown as blank
