= 2016–17 Leeds United F.C. season =

2016–17 season of Leeds United

Leeds United
2016–17 season
- Chairman: Massimo Cellino
- Head coach: Garry Monk
- Stadium: Elland Road
- Championship: 7th
- FA Cup: Fourth round
- EFL Cup: Fifth round
- Top goalscorer: League: Chris Wood (27); All: Chris Wood (30)
- Highest home attendance: 36,002 vs Newcastle United (20 November 2016, Championship)
- Lowest home attendance: 8,488 vs Blackburn Rovers (20 September 2016, EFL Cup)
- Average home league attendance: 27,699
Home colours	Away colours

The 2016–17 season saw Leeds United competing in the Championship (known as the Sky Bet Championship for sponsorship reasons) for a seventh successive season.

== Season summary ==
Since returning to the Championship in 2010, most of Leeds' seasons had seen mid-table mediocrity, with occasional struggles against relegation, and very few promotion challenges. This season, however, would mark the point where they began to turn the corner. Former Swansea City manager Garry Monk took over as Leeds manager, and enjoyed a less-than-auspicious start, losing four of his first six matches in charge. Owner Massimo Cellino nearly sacked Monk, but having seen precious little success with his strategy of chopping and changing managers over the past three years, decided to give him longer.

Cellino was rewarded for his patience when Leeds' form dramatically improved thereafter, with a strong run of form taking them into the play-off places by early November, and even challenging for automatic promotion by the turn of the year, with the goals of Chris Wood, who had already impressed in the previous season, being crucial to their promotion challenge. While they remained in the play-off places until the final weeks of the seasons, an injury crisis combined with a barren spell for Wood saw the promotion challenge slowly unravel. They ultimately finished in 7th place with 75 points; in many seasons this would have been good enough for a play-off spot, but an exceptionally strong top six meant Leeds ultimately came nowhere close to securing a spot. Still, the season still marked only the third time since relegation from the Premier League in 2004 that Leeds had finished in the top half of the Championship.

Off the pitch, the season saw Cellino wind down his interest in the club, selling half of his shares to compatriot Andrea Radrizzani in January, before selling him the remainder after the season ended.

== First-team squad ==
=== Squad information ===
N	Pos.	Nat.	Name	Age	Since	App	Goals	Ends	Transfer fee	Notes
1	GK	(England)	Robert Green	46	2016	47	0	2018	Free	
2	DF	(England)	Luke Ayling	35	2016	43	0	2019	£750,000	
4	MF	(France)	Toumani Diagouraga	39	2016 (Winter)	20	3	2018	£600,000	On loan to Ipswich Town
5	DF	(England)	Kyle Bartley	35	2016	50	6	2017	Loan	On loan from Swansea City
6	DF	(Scotland) (England)	Liam Cooper	35	2014	90	2	2018	£600,000	
7	MF	(England)	Kemar Roofe	33	2016	49	3	2020	£3,000,000	
8	MF	(England)	Luke Murphy	37	2013	111	7	2019	£1,000,000	On loan to Burton Albion
9	FW	(New Zealand)	Chris Wood	34	2015	85	43	2019	£3,000,000	
10	FW	(Sweden)	Marcus Antonsson	35	2016	21	3	2019	£1,600,000	
11	FW	(Senegal) (France)	Souleymane Doukara	35	2014	93	18	2018	£1,500,000	
12	GK	(Italy)	Marco Silvestri	35	2014	98	0	2018	£450,000	
14	MF	(Republic of Ireland) (Northern Ireland)	Eunan O'Kane	36	2016	26	0	2018	£1,000,000	
15	MF	(Northern Ireland)	Stuart Dallas	35	2015	83	8	2018	£1,300,000	
16	MF	(England)	Matt Grimes	31	2016	12	0	2017	Loan	On loan from Swansea City
18	DF	(Sweden)	Pontus Jansson	35	2016	37	3	2017	Loan	On loan from Torino
19	MF	(Spain)	Pablo Hernández	41	2016	38	6	2017	Free	
20	FW	(Netherlands) (Democratic Republic of the Congo)	Jordan Botaka	33	2015	14	0	2017	£1,000,000	On loan to Charlton Athletic
21	DF	(England)	Charlie Taylor	33	2011	104	3	2017	Youth system	
22	GK	(England)	Ross Turnbull	41	2015	1	0	2017	Free	
23	MF	(England)	Kalvin Phillips	30	2014	52	2	2019	Youth system	
24	FW	(France)	Hadi Sacko	32	2016	42	2	2017	Loan	On loan from Sporting CP
25	MF	(England) (Guinea-Bissau)	Ronaldo Vieira	28	2016	39	1	2019	Youth system	
26	MF	(Scotland) (England)	Liam Bridcutt	37	2016	52	0	2018	£1,500,000	Club Captain
27	FW	(The Gambia)	Modou Barrow	34	2017 (Winter)	5	0	2017	Loan	On loan from Swansea City
28	DF	(Italy) (Switzerland)	Gaetano Berardi	38	2014	82	0	2018	£250,000	
29	FW	(Spain)	Alfonso Pedraza	30	2017 (Winter)	14	1	2017	Loan	On loan from Villarreal
30	GK	(England)	Bailey Peacock-Farrell	30	2015	1	0	2018	Youth system	
31	DF	(England)	Lewie Coyle	31	2014	23	0	2019	Youth system	
33	DF	(England)	Tyler Denton	31	2014	3	1	2019	Youth system	
34	DF	(Scotland)	Paul McKay	30	2016 (Winter)	1	0	2018	Youth system	
36	FW	(England)	Mallik Wilks	27	2016	1	0	2018	Youth system	
37	MF	(England)	Billy Whitehouse	30	2016	1	0	2017	Undisclosed	
38	DF	(England)	Jack Vann	28	2016	0	0	2017	Youth system	
	DF	(Italy)	Giuseppe Bellusci	37	2014	60	2	2018	£1,600,000	On loan to Empoli
	FW	(Scotland)	Lee Erwin	32	2015	12	0	2018	Free	On loan to Oldham Athletic

- Last updated: 7 May 2017
- Source: Wikipedia players' articles, Leeds United, Sky Sports
- Ordered by Squad Number.

Appearances (starts and substitute appearances) and goals include those in the Championship (and playoffs), League One (and playoffs), FA Cup, EFL Cup and EFL Trophy.

== Transfers ==
=== In ===
Date	Pos.	Nat.	Name	Moving from	Transfer fee	Ref.
28 June 2016	FW	SWE	Marcus Antonsson	Kalmar FF	£1,600,000	
6 July 2016	GK	ENG	Robert Green	Queens Park Rangers	Free	
7 July 2016	MF	JAM	Kemar Roofe	Oxford United	£3,000,000	
2 August 2016	MF	ENG	Billy Whitehouse	Doncaster Rovers	Undisclosed	
11 August 2016	DF	ENG	Luke Ayling	Bristol City	£200,000	
16 August 2016	MF	SCO	Liam Bridcutt	Sunderland	£1,500,000	
31 August 2016	MF	IRL	Eunan O'Kane	Bournemouth	Free (heavily claused)	
1 September 2016	MF	GNB	Romario Vieira		Free	
1 September 2016	MF	IRL	Conor Shaughnessy	Reading	Free	
9 January 2017	MF	ESP	Pablo Hernández	Al-Arabi	Undisclosed	

=== Loans in ===
Start date	Pos.	Nat.	Name	Loan club	End date	Ref.
1 July 2016	DF	ENG	Kyle Bartley	Swansea City	End of season	
5 July 2016	FW	FRA	Hadi Sacko	Sporting CP	End of season	
7 July 2016	MF	ENG	Matt Grimes	Swansea City	End of season	
2 August 2016	MF	ESP	Pablo Hernández	Al-Arabi	2 January 2016	
18 August 2016	DF	SWE	Pontus Jansson	Torino	End of season	
26 August 2016	MF	ITA	Dario Meadows	Roma	End of season	
31 January 2016	FW	ESP	Alfonso Pedraza	Villarreal	End of season	
31 January 2016	FW	GAM	Modou Barrow	Swansea City	End of season	

=== Loans out ===
Start date	Pos.	Nat.	Name	Loan club	End date	Ref.
1 July 2016	DF	ITA	Giuseppe Bellusci	Empoli	End of season	
9 July 2016	FW	SCO	Lee Erwin	Oldham Athletic	End of season	
11 August 2016	FW	DRC	Jordan Botaka	Charlton Athletic	End of season	
18 August 2016	MF	ENG	Alex Purver	Guiseley	2 January 2017	
21 September 2016	MF	ENG	Billy Whitehouse	Guiseley	21 December 2016	
22 September 2016	FW	IRL	Frank Mulhern	Southport	22 December 2016	
1 January 2017	FW	SCO	Jack McKay	Airdrieonians	End of season	
6 January 2017	MF	ENG	Luke Murphy	Burton Albion	End of season	
23 January 2017	MF	FRA	Toumani Diagouraga	Ipswich Town	End of season	
23 March 2017	MF	ENG	Alex Purver	Guiseley	30 April 2017	
23 March 2017	DF	ENG	Mike Taylor	Guiseley	30 April 2017	

=== Transfers out ===
Date	Pos.	Nat.	Name	Moving to	Fee	Ref.
30 June 2016	FW	ITA	Mirco Antenucci	SPAL	Released	
30 June 2016	FW	ENG	Tyla Bell	Staveley Miners Welfare	Released	
30 June 2016	GK	IRL	Eric Grimes	Cork City	Released	
30 June 2016	DF	ENG	Ross Killock	Chester	Released	
30 June 2016	MF	ENG	Tom Lyman		Released	
30 June 2016	FW	NIR	Robbie McDaid	Maldon & Tiptree	Released	
30 June 2016	DF	ENG	Jake Skelton	North Ferriby United	Released	
30 June 2016	DF	ENG	Jack Turnbull	Florida Institute of Technology	Released	
30 June 2016	FW	ENG	Lewis Walters	Nottingham Forest	Released	
30 June 2016	DF	ENG	Scott Wootton	MK Dons	Released	
30 June 2016	MF	ITA	Tommaso Bianchi	Ascoli	Undisclosed	
4 July 2016	MF	DEN	Casper Sloth	AaB	Undisclosed	
8 July 2016	MF	ENG	Lewis Cook	Bournemouth	£6,000,000	
1 September 2016	DF	CIV	Sol Bamba	Cardiff City	Mutual termination	
27 January 2017	MF	ENG	Alex Mowatt	Barnsley	£500,000	

=== New contracts ===
No.	Pos.	Nat.	Name	Age	Status	Contract length	Expiry date	Source
	DF	(England)	Tyler Denton	31	Signed	1 year	2017	
	FW	(Republic of Ireland) (England)	Frank Mulhern	29	Signed	1 year	2017	
45	GK	(England)	Bailey Peacock-Farrell	30	Signed	2 years	2018	
	DF	(England)	Tom Pearce	28	Signed	1 year	2017	
	MF	(England)	Alex Purver	30	Signed	1 year	2017	
	FW	(Republic of Ireland)	Eoghan Stokes	30	Signed	1 year	2017	
	MF	(England)	Michael Taylor	28	Signed	1 year	2017	
	DF	(England)	Jack Vann	28	Signed	1 year	2017	
27	MF	(England)	Kalvin Phillips	30	Signed	3 years	2019	
33	DF	(England)	Tyler Denton	31	Signed	3 years	2019	
25	MF	(England) (Guinea-Bissau)	Ronaldo Vieira	28	Signed	3 years	2019	
31	DF	(England)	Lewie Coyle	31	Signed	2 years	2019	
36	FW	(England)	Mallik Wilks	27	Signed	1 year	2018	
	MF	(Kenya)	Clarke Oduor	27	Signed	1 year	2018	
1	GK	(England)	Robert Green	46	Signed	1 year	2018	

== Pre-season ==
13 July 2016	Shelbourne	1–2	Leeds United	Dublin, Republic of Ireland
19:00 BST	Evans 50'	Report	Doukara 9'; Sacko 13'	Stadium: Tolka Park; Attendance: 3,200

16 July 2016	Shamrock Rovers	0–3	Leeds United	Dublin, Republic of Ireland
15:00 BST		Report	Antonsson 7', 55'; Wood 33' (pen.)	Stadium: Tallaght Stadium

22 July 2016	Guiseley	3–4	Leeds United	Guiseley
19:45 BST	Palmer 7', 24'; Lawlor 12'	Report	Stokes 45'; Botaka 63'; Phillips 71'; Doukara 73'	Stadium: Nethermoor Park; Attendance: 2,433

23 July 2016	Peterborough United	2–1	Leeds United	Peterborough
15:00 BST	Coulthirst 48', 65'	Report	Mowatt 16'	Stadium: London Road Stadium

30 July 2016	Leeds United	2–1	Atalanta	Leeds
15:00 BST	Wood 25' (pen.); Roofe 68'; Perico (yellow card) 42'	Report	D'Alessandro 31'	Stadium: Elland Road; Attendance: 11,832

== Competitions ==
=== Overall summary ===
Competition	Starting position	Final position	First match	Last match
Championship	–	7th	7 August 2016	7 May 2017
FA Cup	Third round	Fourth round	9 January 2017	29 January 2017
EFL Cup	First round	Fifth round	9 August 2016	29 November 2016

Last updated: 7 May 2017

=== Championship ===
==== League table ====
Pos	Team	Pld	W	D	L	GF	GA	GD	Pts	Promotion, qualification or relegation
5	Huddersfield Town (O, P)	46	25	6	15	56	58	−2	81	Qualification for the Championship play-offs (Note: Four teams play for one spot and promotion to the Premier League.)
6	Fulham	46	22	14	10	85	57	+28	80	Qualification for the Championship play-offs
7	Leeds United	46	22	9	15	61	47	+14	75	
8	Norwich City	46	20	10	16	85	69	+16	70	
9	Derby County	46	18	13	15	54	50	+4	67	

Source: English Football League, Soccerway
Rules for classification: 1) Points; 2) Goal difference; 3) Number of goals scored; 4) Points in head-to-head matches; 5) Goal difference in head-to-head matches; 6) Goals scored in head-to-head matches; 7) Play-off.
(O) Play-off winners; (P) Promoted

==== Results summary ====
Overall								Home						Away					
Pld	W	D	L	GF	GA	GD	Pts	W	D	L	GF	GA	GD	W	D	L	GF	GA	GD
46	22	9	15	61	47	+14	75	14	4	5	32	16	+16	8	5	10	29	31	−2

Last updated: 7 May 2017.
Source: The Football League

==== Results by matchday ====
Matchday	1	2	3	4	5	6	7	8	9	10	11	12	13	14	15	16	17	18	19	20	21	22	23	24	25	26	27	28	29	30	31	32	33	34	35	36	37	38	39	40	41	42	43	44	45	46
Ground	A	H	H	A	A	H	H	A	H	A	H	A	H	A	H	A	H	A	H	A	H	H	A	A	H	H	A	H	A	A	H	H	A	H	A	A	H	H	A	A	H	A	H	A	H	A
Result	L	L	D	W	L	L	W	W	W	L	W	L	D	W	W	W	L	W	W	L	W	W	W	D	W	W	L	W	W	L	L	W	D	W	W	D	D	W	L	L	W	D	L	L	D	D
Position	24	23	20	16	21	22	17	14	12	14	11	12	13	10	9	6	7	5	4	4	5	5	5	4	4	3	4	3	4	5	5	5	5	4	4	4	4	4	5	5	5	5	7	7	7	7

Updated to match(es) played on 7 May 2017. Source: Matches
A = Away; H = Home; W = Win; D = Draw; L = Loss

==== Matches ====
7 August 2016 1	Queens Park Rangers	3–0	Leeds United	Shepherd's Bush, London
12:00 BST	Onuoha 4'; Chery 72' (pen.); Polter 90+3'; Gladwin (yellow card) 25'; Bidwell (yellow card) 32'	Report	Grimes (yellow card) 58'	Stadium: Loftus Road; Attendance: 16,764 (3,213 away); Referee: Oliver Langford

13 August 2016 2	Leeds United	1–2	Birmingham City	Leeds
15:00 BST	Sacko 27'; Hernández (yellow card) 53'	Report	Maghoma 15'; Morrison 55' (yellow card) 84'; Kieftenbeld (yellow card) 33'; Davis (yellow card) 45+1'; Grounds (yellow card) 90+1'; Gleeson (yellow card) 90+2'	Stadium: Elland Road; Attendance: 27,492 (960 away); Referee: Paul Tierney

16 August 2016 3	Leeds United	1–1	Fulham	Leeds
19:45 BST	Wood 90+3'; Bartley (yellow card) 76'	Report	Cairney 77'; Odoi (yellow card) 54'	Stadium: Elland Road; Attendance: 21,204 (391 away); Referee: Chris Kavanagh

20 August 2016 4	Sheffield Wednesday	0–2	Leeds United	Sheffield
12:30 BST	Bannan (yellow card) 40'	Report	Antonsson 63'; Wood 85'; Vieira (yellow card) 60'; Bridcutt (yellow card) 79'	Stadium: Hillsborough Stadium; Attendance: 29,075 (3,887 away); Referee: Simon Hooper

27 August 2016 5	Nottingham Forest	3–1	Leeds United	Nottingham
15:00 BST	Kasami 16'; Perquis 71'; Burke 90+4'	Report	Phillips 83'; Vieira (yellow card) 36'; Bridcutt (yellow card) 64'	Stadium: City Ground; Attendance: 20,995 (1,925 away); Referee: Geoff Eltringham

10 September 2016 6	Leeds United	0–1	Huddersfield Town	Leeds
15:00 BST	Jansson (yellow card) 74'	Report	Mooy 55' (yellow card) 45'; Smith (yellow card) 62'; Bunn (yellow card) 72' van La Parra (yellow card) 73'; Löwe (yellow card) 86'	Stadium: Elland Road; Attendance: 28,084 (2,721 away); Referee: Roger East

13 September 2016 7	Leeds United	2–1	Blackburn Rovers	Leeds
19:45 BST	Wood 65'; Bartley 86'; Green (yellow card) 6'; Sacko (yellow card) 44'; Ayling (yellow card) 80'	Report	Emnes 77'; Greer (yellow card) 26'; Lenihan (yellow card) 81'; Marshall (yellow card) 90+8'	Stadium: Elland Road; Attendance: 28,009 (327 away); Referee: Daniel Adcock

17 September 2016 8	Cardiff City	0–2	Leeds United	Cardiff, Wales
12:30 BST		Report	Wood 62' (pen.); Hernández 82'; Sacko (yellow card) 27'; Ayling (yellow card) 42'; Dallas (yellow card) 54'	Stadium: Cardiff City Stadium; Attendance: 16,608 (2,047 away); Referee: Graham Scott

24 September 2016 9	Leeds United	1–0	Ipswich Town	Leeds
15:00 BST	Wood 35'	Report	Bru (yellow card) 76'; Berra (yellow card) 81'	Stadium: Elland Road; Attendance: 22,554 (902 away); Referee: Stephen Martin

27 September 2016 10	Bristol City	1–0	Leeds United	Bristol
19:45 BST	Pack (yellow card) 34' (goal) 59'; Tomlin (yellow card) 45+2'	Report	Jansson (yellow card) 44'; Dallas (yellow card) 45+2'; Pablo Hernández (yellow card) 59'; Taylor (yellow card) 88'	Stadium: Ashton Gate Stadium; Attendance: 19,699 (2,065 away); Referee: Keith Stroud

1 October 2016 11	Leeds United	2–1	Barnsley	Leeds
15:00 BST	Bartley 36'; Hernández 54'; Taylor (yellow card) 90+1'	Report	Taylor 70' (o.g.)	Stadium: Elland Road; Attendance: 27,350 (2,413 away); Referee: Simon Hooper

15 October 2016 12	Derby County	1–0	Leeds United	Derby
15:00 BST	Russell 56'; Hughes (yellow card) 47'; Johnson (yellow card) 72'	Report		Stadium: Pride Park Stadium; Attendance: 31,170 (3,132 away); Referee: Tony Harrington

18 October 2016 13	Leeds United	1–1	Wigan Athletic	Leeds
19:45 BST	Wood 29'	Report	MacDonald 90+1'	Stadium: Elland Road; Attendance: 19,861 (403 away); Referee: Peter Bankes

22 October 2016 14	Wolverhampton Wanderers	0–1	Leeds United	Wolverhampton
15:00 BST	Doherty (yellow card) 34'; Edwards (yellow card) 45+5'	Report	Sílvio 71' (o.g.); Taylor (yellow card) 78'; Mowatt (yellow card) 90+5'	Stadium: Molineux Stadium; Attendance: 23,607 (2,354 away); Referee: Stuart Attwell

29 October 2016 15	Leeds United	2–0	Burton Albion	Leeds
15:00 BST	Wood 83' (pen.); Doukara 90+6' (yellow card) 90+7'; O'Kane (yellow card) 45+1'; Jansson (yellow card) 76'; Vieira (yellow card) 90+4'	Report	Akins (yellow card) 64'; Turner (yellow card) 82'	Stadium: Elland Road; Attendance: 24,220 (552 away); Referee: Jeremy Simpson

5 November 2016 16	Norwich City	2–3	Leeds United	Norwich
15:00 GMT	Brady 24'; Lafferty 88'; Hoolahan (yellow card) 39'; Jerome (yellow card) 69'	Report	Jansson 57' (yellow card) 57'; Wood 74'; Vieira 90+1'; Phillips (yellow card) 90'	Stadium: Carrow Road; Attendance: 26,903 (2,484 away); Referee: Andy Davies

20 November 2016 17	Leeds United	0–2	Newcastle United	Leeds
13:15 GMT	Jansson (yellow card) 44'	Report	Gayle 23', 54'; Colback (yellow card) 59'	Stadium: Elland Road; Attendance: 36,002 (2,764 away); Referee: Graham Scott

26 November 2016 18	Rotherham United	1–2	Leeds United	Rotherham
17:15 GMT	Wood 86'; Odemwingie (red card) 29'	Report	Wood 14'; Doukara 45+7'; O'Kane (yellow card) 54'; Green (yellow card) 90+2'	Stadium: New York Stadium; Attendance: 10,513 (2,277 away); Referee: Stuart Attwell

3 December 2016 19	Leeds United	2–0	Aston Villa	Leeds
17:30 GMT	Roofe 68'; Wood 90+4'; Phillips (yellow card) 41'; Jansson (yellow card) 76'	Report	Jedinak (yellow card) 15'; Ayew (yellow card) 90'; Grealish (yellow card) 90'	Stadium: Elland Road; Attendance: 32,648 (2,773 away); Referee: Peter Bankes

9 December 2016 20	Brighton & Hove Albion	2–0	Leeds United	Brighton and Hove
19:45 GMT	Murray 23' (pen.) (yellow card) 26'; Hemed 82' (pen.)	Report	Phillips (red card) 23'; Ayling (yellow card) 11'; Jansson (yellow card) 19'; Bartley (yellow card) 81'	Stadium: Falmer Stadium; Attendance: 28,206 (2,736 away); Referee: Paul Tierney

13 December 2016 21	Leeds United	2–0	Reading	Leeds
19:45 GMT	Wood 19'; Ayling (yellow card) 49'; Doukara 90+1' (pen.)	Report	Méïte (yellow card) 86'	Stadium: Elland Road; Attendance: 21,242 (333 away); Referee: Geoff Eltringham

17 December 2016 22	Leeds United	1–0	Brentford	Leeds
15:00 GMT	Bartley 89' (yellow card) 51'	Report	Egan (yellow card) 74'	Stadium: Elland Road; Attendance: 25,134 (421 away); Referee: Darren Bond

26 December 2016 23	Preston North End	1–4	Leeds United	Preston
15:00 GMT	Vermijl 27'; Beckford (red card) 69'; Clarke (yellow card) 72'; Baptiste (yellow card) 86'	Report	Roofe 17'; Sacko 23'; Doukara 31'; Hernández 88'; Phillips (yellow card) 43'; Bartley (yellow card) 50'	Stadium: Deepdale; Attendance: 21,255 (5,551 away); Referee: Jeremy Simpson

29 December 2016 24	Aston Villa	1–1	Leeds United	Birmingham
19:45 GMT	Kodjia 86' (pen.); Gestede (yellow card) 86'; Bacuna (yellow card) 87'; Chester (yellow card) 90+2'	Report	Jansson 54' (yellow card) 86'; Bridcutt (yellow card) 59'; Cooper (yellow card) 85'	Stadium: Villa Park; Attendance: 37,078 (2,818 away); Referee: Roger East

2 January 2017 25	Leeds United	3–0	Rotherham United	Leeds
15:00 GMT	Bartley 47'; Wood 66', 79'; Jansson (yellow card) 57'	Report	Mattock (yellow card) 53'	Stadium: Elland Road; Attendance: 33,397 (387 away); Referee: Stephen Martin

13 January 2017 26	Leeds United	1–0	Derby County	Leeds
19:45 GMT	Wood 45'; Bartley (yellow card) 51'; Hernández (yellow card) 56'	Report	Johnson (yellow card) 64' (yellow-red card) 89'; Baird (yellow card) 74'; Ince (yellow card) 82'	Stadium: Elland Road; Attendance: 25,546 (896 away); Referee: Scott Duncan

21 January 2017 27	Barnsley	3–2	Leeds United	Barnsley
17:30 GMT	Bradshaw 45'; Kent 48'; Hourihane 54' (yellow card) 21'; Watkins (yellow card) 66'; Scowen (yellow card) 67'; Armstrong (yellow card) 82'	Report	Wood 18', 68' (pen.); Roofe (yellow card) 53'; Bartley (yellow card) 57'; O'Kane (yellow card) 70'	Stadium: Oakwell Stadium; Attendance: 17,817 (5,241 away); Referee: Mike Dean

25 January 2017 28	Leeds United	2–0	Nottingham Forest	Leeds
19:45 GMT	Wood 55'; Doukara 74'; Ayling (yellow card) 90+3'	Report		Stadium: Elland Road; Attendance: 24,838 (567 away); Referee: Tony Harrington

1 February 2017 29	Blackburn Rovers	1–2	Leeds United	Blackburn
19:45 GMT	Bennett 83'	Report	Dallas 74'; Jansson 89' (yellow card) 35'	Stadium: Ewood Park; Attendance: 17,026 (6,402 away); Referee: Geoff Eltringham

5 February 2017 30	Huddersfield Town	2–1	Leeds United	Huddersfield
12:00 GMT	Brown 27'; Hefele 89'; Kachunga (yellow card) 90+2'; Wells (yellow card) 90+8'	Report	Ayling (yellow card) 19'; Wood 35'; Bartley (yellow card) 73'; Hernández (yellow card) 81'; Bridcutt (yellow card) 90+1'; Jansson (yellow card) 90+3'	Stadium: Galpharm Stadium; Attendance: 22,400 (2,000 away); Referee: Simon Hooper

11 February 2017 31	Leeds United	0–2	Cardiff City	Leeds
15:00 GMT	Ayling (yellow card) 31'; Bridcutt (yellow card) 43' (yellow-red card) 86'; Cooper (yellow card) 88'	Report	Morrison 53'; Halford (yellow card) 64'; Zohore 71'	Stadium: Elland Road; Attendance: 30,761 (485 away); Referee: James Linington

14 February 2017 32	Leeds United	2–1	Bristol City	Leeds
19:45 GMT	Wood 27'; Hernández 47'; Ayling (yellow card) 52'; Vieira (yellow card) 71'	Report	Đurić 90+6'; Tomlin (yellow card) 29'; Cotterill (yellow card) 44'; Wright (yellow card) 66'	Stadium: Elland Road; Attendance: 22,402 (330 away); Referee: Jeremy Simpson

18 February 2017 33	Ipswich Town	1–1	Leeds United	Ipswich
15:00 GMT	Sears 9'; Knudsen (yellow card) 85'	Report	Dallas 42'	Stadium: Portman Road; Attendance: 18,745 (2,113 away); Referee: Keith Stroud

25 February 2017 34	Leeds United	1–0	Sheffield Wednesday	Leeds
12:30 GMT	Wood 24' (yellow card) 90+2'; Jansson (yellow card) 41'; Doukara (yellow card) 53'; O'Kane (yellow card) 70'; Bridcutt (yellow card) 87'	Report	Sasso (yellow card) 31'; Wallace (yellow card) 63'	Stadium: Elland Road; Attendance: 35,093 (2,746 away); Referee: Mike Jones

3 March 2017 35	Birmingham City	1–3	Leeds United	Birmingham
19:45 GMT	Gardner 63'; Davis (yellow card) 78'; Tesche (yellow card) 90+3'	Report	Wood 14', 67'; Pedraza 81'	Stadium: St Andrew's; Attendance: 20,321 (3,281 away); Referee: Chris Kavanagh

7 March 2017 36	Fulham	1–1	Leeds United	Fulham, London
19:45 GMT	Cairney 90+5' (yellow card) 90+6'; McDonald (yellow card) 32'; Johansen (yellow card) 35'	Report	Ream 5' (o.g.); Sacko (yellow card) 22'; Phillips (red card) 89'; Barrow (yellow card) 80'	Stadium: Craven Cottage; Attendance: 22,239 (6,587 away); Referee: Lee Probert

11 March 2017 37	Leeds United	0–0	Queens Park Rangers	Leeds
15:00 GMT	Ayling (yellow card) 35'; Pedraza (yellow card) 48'; Bridcutt (yellow card) 66'; O'Kane (yellow card) 90+4'	Report	Bidwell (yellow card) 87'; Mackie (yellow card) 90+4'	Stadium: Elland Road; Attendance: 30,870 (693 away); Referee: Tim Robinson

18 March 2017 38	Leeds United	2–0	Brighton & Hove Albion	Leeds
17:30 GMT	Wood 63', 85' (pen.)	Report	Rosenior (yellow card) 37'; Murray (yellow card) 67'	Stadium: Elland Road; Attendance: 29,797 (1,795 away); Referee: Lee Mason

1 April 2017 39	Reading	1–0	Leeds United	Reading
17:30 BST	Kermorgant 21' (yellow card) 90'; Swift (yellow card) 52'; Williams (yellow card) 84'	Report		Stadium: Madejski Stadium; Attendance: 23,055 (3,546 away); Referee: Keith Stroud

4 April 2017 40	Brentford	2–0	Leeds United	Brentford, London
15:00 BST	Sawyers 19' (yellow card) 85'; Vibe 34'; McCormack (yellow card) 74'	Report		Stadium: Griffin Park; Attendance: 10,759 (1,656 away); Referee: David Coote

8 April 2017 41	Leeds United	3–0	Preston North End	Leeds
15:00 BST	Roofe 18'; Hernández 45'; Doukara 90+3'; Wood (yellow card) 78'	Report	Baptiste (red card) 86'	Stadium: Elland Road; Attendance: 31,851 (827 away); Referee: Peter Bankes

14 April 2017 42	Newcastle United	1–1	Leeds United	Newcastle
19:45 BST	Lascelles 67' Shelvey (yellow card) 90+4'; Colback (yellow card) 90+4'	Report	Wood 90+5' Jansson (yellow card) 52'; Bartley (yellow card) 54'; Phillips (yellow card) 75'	Stadium: St James' Park; Attendance: 52,301 (3,200 away); Referee: Chris Kavanagh

17 April 2017 43	Leeds United	0–1	Wolverhampton Wanderers	Leeds
15:00 BST	Bridcutt (yellow card) 16'; Bartley (yellow card) 28'	Report	Dicko 38'; Saville (yellow card) 43'; Böðvarsson (yellow card) 76'	Stadium: Elland Road; Attendance: 32,351 (1,164 away); Referee: Jeremy Simpson

22 April 2017 44	Burton Albion	2–1	Leeds United	Burton upon Trent
15:00 BST	Sordell 75'; Kightly 77' (yellow card) 89'	Report	Bartley 80'	Stadium: Pirelli Stadium; Attendance: 6,073 (1,649 away); Referee: Darren Bond

29 April 2017 45	Leeds United	3–3	Norwich City	Leeds
15:00 BST	Wood 45+1'; Bartley 49'; Hernández 78'; Jansson (yellow card) 63'; Berardi (yellow card) 77'	Report	Naismith 28' (red card) 89'; Oliveira 34', 45'; Dorrans (yellow card) 77'	Stadium: Elland Road; Attendance: 34,292 (1,150 away); Referee: Tony Harrington

7 May 2017 46	Wigan Athletic	1–1	Leeds United	Wigan
12:00 BST	Tunnicliffe 6'; Burn (yellow card) 24'	Report	Wood 50' (pen.); Green (yellow card) 25'; Bartley (yellow card) 39'	Stadium: DW Stadium; Attendance: 15,280 (4,720 away); Referee: Scott Duncan

=== FA Cup ===
9 January 2017 Third round	Cambridge United	1–2	Leeds United	Cambridge
19:45 GMT	Ikpeazu 25'	Report	Dallas 56'; Mowatt 63'; Phillips (yellow card) 22'; Jansson (yellow card) 25'; Berardi (yellow card) 28'	Stadium: Abbey Stadium; Attendance: 7,973; Referee: Craig Pawson

29 January 2017 Fourth round	Sutton United	1–0	Leeds United	Sutton, London
14:00 GMT	Deacon (yellow card) 40'; Collins 53' (pen.); Bailey (yellow card) 76'	Report	Cooper (red card) 18'; Denton (yellow card) 32'; Sacko (yellow card) 90+4'	Stadium: Gander Green Lane; Attendance: 4,997; Referee: Stuart Attwell

=== EFL Cup ===
10 August 2016 First round	Fleetwood Town	2–2 (a.e.t.) (4–5 p)	Leeds United	Fleetwood
19:45 BST	Amadi-Holloway 13'; Hunter 111'; Pond (yellow card) 82'; Eastham (yellow card) 94'	Report	Antonsson 89'; Wood 94' (pen.); Vieira (yellow card) 20'; Bartley (yellow card) 78'; Bamba (yellow card) 82'	Stadium: Highbury Stadium; Attendance: 3,326; Referee: David Coote
	Penalties
	Grant (penalty scored); Ryan (penalty scored); McLaughlin (penalty scored); Hunter (penalty scored); Jónsson (penalty missed)		(penalty scored) Wood; (penalty scored) Antonsson; (penalty scored) Mowatt; (penalty scored) Phillips; (penalty scored) Hernández

23 August 2016 Second round	Luton Town	0–1	Leeds United	Luton
19:45 BST	Lee (yellow card) 53'	Report	Denton 23'; Grimes (yellow card) 1'; Coyle (yellow card) 62'	Stadium: Kenilworth Road; Attendance: 7,498; Referee: Kevin Johnson

20 September 2016 Third round	Leeds United	1–0	Blackburn Rovers	Leeds
19:45 BST	Wood 85'; Phillips (yellow card) 29'	Report	Akpan (yellow card) 11'; Lenihan (yellow card) 79'; Emnes (yellow card) 90'	Stadium: Elland Road; Attendance: 8,488; Referee: Darren Deadman

25 October 2016 Fourth round	Leeds United	2–2 (a.e.t.) (3–2 p)	Norwich City	Leeds
19:45 BST	Bartley (yellow card) 40'; Antonsson 43'; Mowatt (yellow card) 45'; Wood 109'; Silvestri (yellow card) 110'	Report	Pritchard 14'; Bennett (yellow card) 43'; Brady (yellow card) 79'; Nélson Oliveira 99'; Sergi Canós (yellow card) 113'	Stadium: Elland Road; Attendance: 22,222; Referee: Andy Woolmer
	Penalties
	Wood (penalty scored); Roofe (penalty scored); Phillips (penalty missed); Grimes (penalty missed); Ronaldo Vieira (penalty scored)		Dorrans (penalty scored); Pritchard (penalty missed); Naismith (penalty missed); Nélson Oliveira (penalty scored); Brady (penalty missed)

29 November 2016 Fifth round	Liverpool	2–0	Leeds United	Liverpool
19:45 BST	Origi 76' (yellow card) 90+1'; Woodburn 81'	Report	Doukara (yellow card) 56'	Stadium: Anfield; Attendance: 52,012; Referee: Andre Marriner

== Statistics ==
=== Appearances and goals ===
As of 7 May 2017

No.	Pos	Nat	Player	Total		Championship		FA Cup		EFL Cup	
No.	Pos	Nat	Player	Apps	Goals	Apps	Goals	Apps	Goals	Apps	Goals
1	GK	(England) ENG	Robert Green	47	0	46+0	0	0+0	0	1+0	0
2	DF	(England) ENG	Luke Ayling	43	0	42+0	0	0+0	0	0+1	0
5	DF	(England) ENG	Kyle Bartley (On loan from Swansea City)	50	6	45+0	6	0+1	0	4+0	0
6	DF	(Scotland) SCO	Liam Cooper	18	0	8+3	0	2+0	0	4+1	0
7	MF	(England) ENG	Kemar Roofe	49	3	28+14	3	0+2	0	5+0	0
9	FW	(New Zealand) NZL	Chris Wood	49	30	42+3	27	0+0	0	1+3	3
10	FW	(Sweden) SWE	Marcus Antonsson	21	3	6+10	1	2+0	0	2+1	2
11	FW	(Senegal) SEN	Souleymane Doukara	38	6	16+17	6	2+0	0	3+0	0
12	GK	(Italy) ITA	Marco Silvestri	6	0	0+0	0	2+0	0	4+0	0
14	MF	(Republic of Ireland) IRL	Eunan O'Kane	26	0	20+4	0	0+0	0	2+0	0
15	MF	(Northern Ireland) NIR	Stuart Dallas	35	3	20+11	2	2+0	1	2+0	0
16	MF	(England) ENG	Matt Grimes (On loan from Swansea City)	12	0	1+6	0	2+0	0	2+1	0
18	DF	(Sweden) SWE	Pontus Jansson (On loan from Torino)	36	3	34+0	3	1+0	0	1+0	0
19	MF	(Spain) ESP	Pablo Hernández	38	6	32+3	6	0+0	0	2+1	0
21	DF	(England) ENG	Charlie Taylor	32	0	26+3	0	0+0	0	3+0	0
22	GK	(England) ENG	Ross Turnbull	0	0	0+0	0	0+0	0	0+0	0
23	MF	(England) ENG	Kalvin Phillips	40	1	23+10	1	2+0	0	2+3	0
24	FW	(France) FRA	Hadi Sacko (On loan from Sporting CP)	42	2	28+10	2	0+1	0	2+1	0
25	MF	(England) ENG	Ronaldo Vieira	38	1	24+10	1	0+0	0	4+0	0
26	MF	(Scotland) SCO	Liam Bridcutt	25	0	22+3	0	0+0	0	0+0	0
27	FW	(The Gambia) GAM	Modou Barrow (On loan from Swansea City)	5	0	1+4	0	0+0	0	0+0	0
28	DF	(Switzerland) SUI	Gaetano Berardi	29	0	24+2	0	1+0	0	2+0	0
29	FW	(Spain) ESP	Alfonso Pedraza (On loan from Villarreal)	14	1	8+6	1	0+0	0	0+0	0
30	GK	(England) ENG	Bailey Peacock-Farrell	0	0	0+0	0	0+0	0	0+0	0
31	DF	(England) ENG	Lewie Coyle	10	0	3+1	0	1+1	0	4+0	0
33	DF	(England) ENG	Tyler Denton	3	1	0+0	0	2+0	0	1+0	1
34	DF	(Scotland) SCO	Paul McKay	1	0	0+0	0	1+0	0	0+0	0
36	FW	(England) ENG	Mallik Wilks	1	0	0+0	0	0+1	0	0+0	0
37	MF	(England) ENG	Billy Whitehouse	1	0	0+0	0	1+0	0	0+0	0
38	DF	(England) ENG	Jack Vann	0	0	0+0	0	0+0	0	0+0	0
Players currently out on loan:
4	MF	(France) FRA	Toumani Diagouraga (On loan to Ipswich Town)	1	0	1+0	0	0+0	0	0+0	0
8	MF	(England) ENG	Luke Murphy (On loan to Burton Albion)	1	0	0+0	0	0+0	0	1+0	0
20	FW	(Democratic Republic of the Congo) COD	Jordan Botaka (On loan to Charlton Athletic)	0	0	0+0	0	0+0	0	0+0	0
	DF	(Italy) ITA	Giuseppe Bellusci (On loan to Empoli)	0	0	0+0	0	0+0	0	0+0	0
	FW	(Scotland) SCO	Lee Erwin (On loan to Oldham Athletic)	0	0	0+0	0	0+0	0	0+0	0
Players who have been available for selection this season, but have now permanently left the club:
3	DF	(Ivory Coast) CIV	Sol Bamba	4	0	2+0	0	0+0	0	1+1	0
27	MF	(England) ENG	Alex Mowatt	20	1	4+11	0	1+0	1	2+2	0

Source: Sky Sports

=== Top scorers ===
Place	Position	Nationality	Number	Name	Championship	FA Cup	EFL Cup	Total
1	FW	(New Zealand)	9	Chris Wood	27	0	3	30
2	FW	(Senegal)	11	Souleymane Doukara	6	0	0	6
2	DF	(England)	5	Kyle Bartley	6	0	0	6
2	MF	(Spain)	19	Pablo Hernández	6	0	0	6
3	FW	(Sweden)	10	Marcus Antonsson	1	0	2	3
3	MF	(Northern Ireland)	15	Stuart Dallas	2	1	0	3
3	DF	(Sweden)	18	Pontus Jansson	3	0	0	3
3	FW	(England)	7	Kemar Roofe	3	0	0	3
4	Own goal				2	0	0	2
4	FW	(France)	24	Hadi Sacko	2	0	0	2
5	DF	(England)	33	Tyler Denton	0	0	1	1
5	MF	(England)	27	Alex Mowatt_{1}	0	1	0	1
5	FW	(Spain)	29	Alfonso Pedraza	1	0	0	1
5	MF	(England)	23	Kalvin Phillips	1	0	0	1
5	MF	(Portugal)	25	Ronaldo Vieira	1	0	0	1
TOTALS					61	2	6	70

_{1}Mowatt left the club on 27 January 2017.

=== Disciplinary record ===
Last Updated: 7 May 2017

Nation	Name	Yellow card	Red card
(England)	Kalvin Phillips	6	2
(Scotland)	Liam Bridcutt	7	1
(Scotland)	Liam Cooper	1	1
(Sweden)	Pontus Jansson	15	0
(England)	Luke Ayling	10	0
(England)	Kyle Bartley	12	0
(Portugal)	Ronaldo Vieira	5	0
(Spain)	Pablo Hernández	4	0
(Republic of Ireland)	Eunan O'Kane	4	0
(France)	Hadi Sacko	4	0
(Senegal)	Souleymane Doukara	3	0
(England)	Robert Green	3	0
(England)	Charlie Taylor	3	0
(Switzerland)	Gaetano Berardi	2	0
(Northern Ireland)	Stuart Dallas	2	0
(England)	Matt Grimes	2	0
(England)	Alex Mowatt_{2}	2	0
(New Zealand)	Chris Wood	2	0
(Ivory Coast)	Sol Bamba_{1}	1	0
(The Gambia)	Modou Barrow	1	0
(England)	Tyler Denton	1	0
(England)	Lewie Coyle	1	0
(Spain)	Alfonso Pedraza	1	0
(Italy)	Marco Silvestri	1	0

_{1}Bamba left club on 1 September 2016. _{2}Mowatt left club on 27 January 2017.

==== Suspensions served ====
As of 29 April 2017

Date	Matches Missed	Player	Reason	Opponents Missed
20 November 2016	1	Pontus Jansson	(yellow card) (yellow card) (yellow card) (yellow card) (yellow card) vs Newcastle (H)	Rotherham (A)
9 December 2016	1	Kalvin Phillips	(red card) vs Brighton (A)	Reading (H)
9 January 2017	2	Pontus Jansson	(yellow card) (yellow card) (yellow card) (yellow card) (yellow card) (yellow card) (yellow card) (yellow card) (yellow card) (yellow card) vs Cambridge (FA)	Derby (A), Barnsley (A)
29 January 2017	1	Liam Cooper	(red card) vs Sutton (FA)	Blackburn (A)
11 February 2017	1	Liam Bridcutt	(red card) vs Cardiff (H)	Bristol City (H)
7 March 2017	2	Kalvin Phillips	(red card) vs Fulham (A)	QPR (H), Brighton (H)
11 March 2017	2	Luke Ayling	(yellow card) (yellow card) (yellow card) (yellow card) (yellow card) (yellow card) (yellow card) (yellow card) (yellow card) (yellow card) vs QPR (A)	Brighton (H), Reading (A)
1 April 2017	6	Liam Cooper	Violent conduct vs Reading (A)	Brentford (A), Preston (H), Newcastle (A), Wolves (H), Burton (A), Norwich (H)
29 April 2017	3	Pontus Jansson	(yellow card) (yellow card) (yellow card) (yellow card) (yellow card) (yellow card) (yellow card) (yellow card) (yellow card) (yellow card) (yellow card) (yellow card) (yellow card) (yellow card) (yellow card) vs Norwich (H)	Wigan (A)
