= Tyler Denton =

English footballer (born 1995)

Personal information
- Full name: Tyler Jake Denton
- Date of birth: 6 September 1995 (age 31)
- Place of birth: Dewsbury, England
- Height: 5 ft 8 in (1.73 m)
- Positions: Left-back; midfielder

Team information
- Current team: Scunthorpe United
- Number: 33

Youth career
- 2003–2014: Leeds United

Senior career*
Years	Team	Apps	(Gls)
2014–2019	Leeds United	0	(0)
2017–2018	→ Port Vale (loan)	15	(0)
2018–2019	→ Peterborough United (loan)	10	(0)
2019–2020	Stevenage	15	(0)
2020–2021	Chesterfield	5	(0)
2021–2023	King's Lynn Town	88	(3)
2023–	Scunthorpe United	126	(4)

International career
2011	England U17	1	(0)
- * Club domestic league appearances and goals as of 19:03, 26 April 2026 (UTC)

Tyler Jake Denton (born 6 September 1995) is an English professional footballer who plays as a left-back for National League club Scunthorpe United.

A former England U17 international, he can also play as a midfielder. He turned professional at Leeds United in 2014 and joined Port Vale on loan for the first half of the 2017–18 season. He joined Peterborough United on loan for the 2018–19 season and was sold to Stevenage in July 2019. From Stevenage, he moved to Chesterfield in October 2020 and King's Lynn Town in January 2021. He joined Scunthorpe United in July 2023 and was named in the 2023–24 National League North Team of the Year. He helped the club win promotion via the play-offs in 2025.

== Club career ==
=== Leeds United ===
Denton started his career at Leeds United in 2003 and graduated through the academy, turning professional in the summer of 2014, before being appointed as the under-21 captain for the 2015–16 season. Under new manager Garry Monk, Denton was called into Leeds first-team squad for their friendlies for the 2016–17 pre-season and was given squad number 33. He made his first-team debut on 23 August, when he started at left-back in an EFL Cup fixture against Luton Town; he scored the only goal of the game and was subsequently named in the competition's team of the second round. Three days later he signed a new three-year contract. On 9 January 2017, Denton made his next appearance for Leeds when he started in their 2–1 FA Cup win at Cambridge United. He made his third appearance in the next round of the competition 20 days later, as Leeds were eliminated by non-League side Sutton United. He signed a new three-year contract in August 2017.

==== Port Vale loan ====
On 7 August 2017, Denton joined EFL League Two side Port Vale on loan for the 2017–18 season, with a recall clause option in January. The loan was authorized by Leeds manager Thomas Christiansen after he secured Cameron Borthwick-Jackson on a season-long loan. He was a first-team regular under Michael Brown, before losing his place in October under new manager Neil Aspin. He was recalled to Elland Road on 3 January 2018 due to family reasons. Prior to joining Peterborough, Denton was subject of a loan offer from Italian Serie B Side Brescia, owned by previous Leeds owner Massimo Cellino.

==== Peterborough loan ====
On 6 July 2018, Denton joined League One side Peterborough United on loan for the 2018–19 season. Manager Steve Evans had briefly been Leeds manager shortly after Denton had turned professional. His debut for the "Posh" came on 14 August, in a 2–0 defeat to EFL Championship side Queens Park Rangers in the EFL Cup. He made his first league appearance on 27 October, in a 2–1 win over Burton Albion. The form of Colin Daniel and Daniel Lafferty meant that he was limited to 14 appearances during the 2018–19 season and chairman Darragh MacAnthony tweeted that "[he] needs to improve massively if to ever break into Leeds team".

=== Stevenage ===
Denton joined League Two club Stevenage on 11 July 2019, signing for an undisclosed fee. He missed the start of the season due to injury and was only able to feature in one game before manager Dino Maamria was sacked and replaced by Graham Westley. He played 19 games for "Boro" in the 2019–20 season as the club were relegated after finishing bottom of the English Football League and was released by new manager Alex Revell in June 2020.

=== Chesterfield ===
On 10 October 2020, Denton signed with National League side Chesterfield after training with the "Spireties"; manager John Pemberton said he had "been recruited to help the balance of the team [as] we needed a left-sided player to share the workload". However, James Rowe replaced Pemberton as manager the following month and Denton did not start a game under Rowe, who also signed left-backs Joel Taylor and Alex Whittle.

=== King's Lynn Town ===
On 18 January 2021, Denton signed for fellow National League side King's Lynn Town after his release from Chesterfield. He scored his first goal for the club on 27 February, in a 2–2 draw with Weymouth at The Walks. He played 28 games for the "Linnets" in the second half of the 2020–21 season, though admitted that the team were playing for little more than personal pride after relegation was cancelled due to the leagues below abandoning their seasons. He played 28 games as King's Lynn were relegated at the end of the 2021–22 season and had his contract extended by manager Tommy Widdrington. He made 37 appearances in the 2022–23 campaign, including in the 4–1 defeat to Kidderminster Harriers in the semi-finals of the National League North play-offs. Upon Denton's departure from the club, owner Stephen Cleeve said that the player's travel time from his home in York was a factor in his decision to leave King's Lynn.

=== Scunthorpe United ===
On 16 May 2023, he was announced as a player at newly relegated National League North club Scunthorpe United, with a contract to start on 1 July. He played 44 of United's 46 league games in the 2023–24 season, helping Scunthorpe to qualify for the play-offs with a second-place finish. However, he did not feature in the semi-final defeat to Boston United at Glanford Park. He was named in the National League North Team of the Year, alongside teammates Jacob Butterfield and Danny Whitehall. He made 42 league appearances in the 2024–25 season as Scunthorpe again qualified for the play-offs. He went on to start in the play-off final as promotion was secured with a 2–1 win over Chester. He played 40 league games in the 2025–26 campaign. Scunthorpe reached the National League play-off semi-finals, where they were beaten by Rochdale.

== International career ==
In 2011, Denton made his debut for England U17 against the Faroe Islands.

== Style of play ==
Denton is primarily a left-back, but can also play as a midfielder.

== Career statistics ==
As of match played 3 May 2026

Appearances and goals by club, season and competition
Club	Season	League			FA Cup		League Cup		Other		Total	
Club	Season	Division	Apps	Goals	Apps	Goals	Apps	Goals	Apps	Goals	Apps	Goals
Leeds United	2014–15	Championship	0	0	0	0	0	0	—		0	0
Leeds United	2015–16	Championship	0	0	0	0	0	0	—		0	0
Leeds United	2016–17	Championship	0	0	2	0	1	1	—		3	1
Leeds United	2017–18	Championship	0	0	0	0	0	0	—		0	0
Leeds United	2018–19	Championship	0	0	0	0	0	0	0	0	0	0
Leeds United	Total		0	0	2	0	1	1	0	0	3	1
Port Vale (loan)	2017–18	League Two	15	0	3	0	0	0	3 (Note: Appearances in the EFL Trophy)	0	21	0
Peterborough United (loan)	2018–19	League One	10	0	1	0	1	0	2	0	14	0
Stevenage	2019–20	League Two	15	0	0	0	0	0	4	0	19	0
Chesterfield	2020–21	National League	5	0	1	0	—		0	0	6	0
King's Lynn Town	2020–21	National League	28	1	—		—		0	0	28	1
King's Lynn Town	2021–22	National League	27	1	0	0	—		1 (Note: Appearances in the FA Trophy)	0	28	1
King's Lynn Town	2022–23	National League North	33	1	3	0	—		1 (Note: Appearances in the play-offs)	0	37	1
King's Lynn Town	Total		88	3	3	0	0	0	2	0	93	3
Scunthorpe United	2023–24	National League North	44	3	0	0	—		2	0	46	3
Scunthorpe United	2024–25	National League North	42	1	0	0	—		3 (Note: 1 appearance in the FA Trophy and 2 appearances in the play-offs)	0	45	1
Scunthorpe United	2025–26	National League	40	0	1	0	—		5 (Note: 3 appearances in the National League Cup and 2 appearances in the play-offs)	0	46	0
Scunthorpe United	2026–27	National League	0	0	0	0	—		0	0	0	0
Scunthorpe United	Total		126	4	1	0	0	0	10	0	137	4
Career total			259	7	11	0	2	1	21	0	293	8

== Honours ==
Scunthorpe United

- National League North play-offs: 2025

Individual

- National League North Team of the Year: 2023–24
