= Samuel Sáiz =

Spanish footballer

Personal information
- Full name: Samuel Sáiz Alonso
- Date of birth: 22 January 1991 (age 35)
- Place of birth: Madrid, Spain
- Height: 1.74 m (5 ft 9 in)
- Positions: Attacking midfielder; forward

Youth career
- Omega CF
- 1999–2008: Real Madrid

Senior career*
Years	Team	Apps	(Gls)
2008–2011	Real Madrid C	35	(5)
2009–2010	Real Madrid B	23	(5)
2010–2011	→ Sevilla B (loan)	15	(3)
2011–2012	Melilla	16	(1)
2012–2013	Getafe B	44	(11)
2012	Getafe	1	(0)
2013–2014	Almería B	9	(0)
2014–2015	Atlético Madrid B	45	(13)
2015–2016	Atlético Madrid	0	(0)
2015–2016	→ Huesca (loan)	29	(3)
2016–2017	Huesca	40	(12)
2017–2019	Leeds United	53	(5)
2019	→ Getafe (loan)	10	(1)
2019–2023	Girona	104	(10)
2023–2024	Sivasspor	31	(9)
2024–2026	Eyüpspor	26	(4)
2025	→ Pendikspor (loan)	7	(0)

International career
2009	Spain U19	3	(0)
- * Club domestic league appearances and goals as of 20 December 2025

Samuel Sáiz Alonso (born 22 January 1991) is a Spanish professional footballer who plays as an attacking midfielder or a forward.

He spent most of his career in the Spanish lower leagues, amassing Segunda División totals of 165 games and 23 goals with Huesca and Girona after signing with the former club at the age of 24. In La Liga, he appeared in 11 matches for Getafe over two separate spells and eight for Girona, and also spent a year and a half in the English Championship with Leeds United.

== Club career ==
=== Real Madrid ===
Born in Madrid, Sáiz arrived in Real Madrid's youth system at the age of eight. He made his senior debut late into 2008–09 – one game – as the B team competed in the Segunda División B. In the following season, spent in the same level, he contributed more solidly, but they could only rank in eighth position, thus failing to reach the promotion playoff stage.

For the 2010–11 campaign, Sáiz was loaned to Sevilla FC's reserves also in division three, in a season-long move. In the following transfer window, however, he returned to Real Madrid, being assigned to its C side in the Tercera División.

=== Melilla and Getafe ===
On 17 August 2011, Sáiz returned to the third tier and joined UD Melilla, with Real retaining a buyback option on the player. Late into the following transfer window, however, he terminated his contract and signed with Getafe CF's reserves in the same league. He made his first-team – and La Liga – debut on 1 April 2012, coming on as a substitute for Jaime Gavilán for the last 12 minutes of a 3–0 away loss against Atlético Madrid.

=== Almería and Atlético ===
Sáiz signed with UD Almería B on 8 July 2013. In January of the following year he moved teams again, joining Atlético Madrid B also in the third division.

Occasionally called for training with Atlético's main squad under manager Diego Simeone, Sáiz was also an unused substitute in a league match against Villarreal CF.

=== Huesca ===
On 5 August 2015, Sáiz joined SD Huesca from Segunda División in a season-long move. He scored his first professional goal 17 days later, but in a 3–2 home defeat to Deportivo Alavés. He netted a further two times in his first year, from 30 overall appearances.

Sáiz signed a permanent contract with the Aragonese club in late March 2016, until June 2018. In the following campaign he scored a career-best 12 goals, as his team was ousted in the promotion play-offs.

=== Leeds United ===
On 10 July 2017, Huesca and Leeds United reached an agreement for the transfer of Sáiz. Three days later, the latter club announced the signing of a four-year contract after a successful medical. He made his competitive debut on 9 August, scoring a hat-trick in a 4–1 victory over Port Vale in the EFL Cup; in doing so, he became their first player to achieve the feat in his first game since Carl Shutt in 1989. His first Championship appearance took place three days later, in a 0–0 home draw against Preston North End.

Sáiz opened his league scoring account on 19 August 2017, contributing to the 2–0 win at Sunderland. The following 7 January, he was involved in an off-the-ball incident and was shown a red card for allegedly spitting at an opposition player during the 2–1 defeat to Newport County in the FA Cup. He returned from his six-match suspension on 21 February in a 2–2 draw against Derby County, providing an assist for Ezgjan Alioski.

After ending the season with nine goals and seven assists, Sáiz was nominated as one of four players for Leeds' Player of The Year award on 16 April 2018. For the following campaign, he was given the number 14 shirt.

On 17 December 2018, Sáiz was loaned to his former club Getafe for six months. He made his debut on 6 January 2019, playing 16 minutes in a 2–1 home loss against FC Barcelona. He scored his first goal in the Spanish top flight on 28 April, but in a defeat at Real Sociedad by the same scoreline.

=== Girona ===
Sáiz joined Girona FC on 18 July 2019, for an undisclosed fee. He contributed three goals from 40 games in the 2021–22 season, in a return to the top tier after three years; on 1 April 2022, however, as he was being replaced in the first half of the league fixture against Málaga CF (eventual 1–0 home win), he called manager Míchel a "clown" and threw away his shirt.

On 27 January 2023, Sáiz left the Estadi Montilivi after 120 official matches and 12 goals.

=== Sivasspor ===
Sáiz signed a year-and-a-half contract with Sivasspor of the Turkish Süper Lig immediately after leaving Girona.

== International career ==
Sáiz represented Spain at under-19 level.

== Career statistics ==
=== Club ===
As of 7 January 2023

Appearances and goals by club, season and competition
Club	Season	League			National cup		League cup		Other		Total	
Club	Season	Division	Apps	Goals	Apps	Goals	Apps	Goals	Apps	Goals	Apps	Goals
Real Madrid B	2008–09	Segunda División B	1	0	—		—		0	0	1	0
Real Madrid B	2009–10	Segunda División B	22	5	—		—		0	0	22	5
Real Madrid B	Total		26	5	0	0	0	0	0	0	26	5
Sevilla Atlético	2010–11	Segunda División B	15	3	—		—		0	0	15	3
Melilla	2011–12	Segunda División B	16	1	1	0	—		0	0	17	1
Getafe	2011–12	La Liga	1	0	0	0	—		0	0	1	0
Getafe B	2011–12	Segunda División B	13	2	—		—		0	0	13	2
Getafe B	2012–13	Segunda División B	31	9	—		—		0	0	31	9
Getafe B	Total		44	11	0	0	0	0	0	0	44	11
Almería B	2013–14	Segunda División B	9	0	—		—		0	0	9	0
Atlético Madrid B	2013–14	Segunda División B	12	5	—		—		2 (Note: Appearances in Segunda División B relegation play-offs)	2	14	7
Atlético Madrid B	2014–15	Segunda División B	33	8	—		—		0	0	33	8
Atlético Madrid B	Total		45	13	0	0	0	0	2	2	47	15
Huesca	2015–16	Segunda División	29	3	1	0	—		0	0	30	3
Huesca	2016–17	Segunda División	40	12	2	0	—		2 (Note: Appearances in La Liga play-offs)	0	44	12
Huesca	Total		69	15	3	0	0	0	2	0	74	15
Leeds United	2017–18	Championship	34	5	1	0	2	4	0	0	37	9
Leeds United	2018–19	Championship	19	0	0	0	2	1	0	0	21	1
Leeds United	Total		53	5	1	0	4	5	0	0	58	10
Getafe (loan)	2018–19	La Liga	10	1	2	0	—		0	0	12	1
Girona	2019–20	Segunda División	30	2	1	0	—		4	1	35	3
Girona	2020–21	Segunda División	30	3	2	0	—		1	0	33	3
Girona	2021–22	Segunda División	36	3	3	1	—		4	0	43	4
Girona	2022–23	La Liga	8	2	1	0	—		0	0	9	2
Girona	Total		104	10	7	1	0	0	9	1	120	12
Career total			392	64	14	1	4	5	13	3	423	73
