= Kalvin Phillips =

English footballer (born 1995)

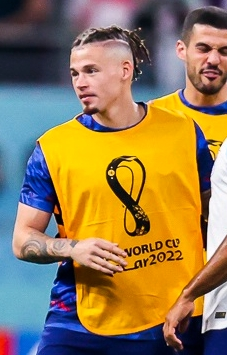
- Phillips with England at the 2022 FIFA World Cup

Personal information
- Full name: Kalvin Mark Phillips
- Date of birth: 2 December 1995 (age 30)
- Place of birth: Leeds, West Yorkshire, England
- Height: 5 ft 10 in (1.78 m)
- Position: Defensive midfielder

Team information
- Current team: Sheffield United (on loan from Manchester City)
- Number: 27

Youth career
- 2012-2014: Leeds United

Senior career*
Years	Team	Apps	(Gls)
2014–2022	Leeds United	214	(13)
2022–	Manchester City	16	(0)
2024	→ West Ham United (loan)	8	(0)
2024–2025	→ Ipswich Town (loan)	19	(0)
2026	→ Sheffield United (loan)	3	(0)
2026–	→ Sheffield United (loan)	11	(1)

International career
2020–2023	England	31	(1)
Medal record
Men's football
Representing England
UEFA European Championship
Runner-up	2020 Europe
- * Club domestic league appearances and goals as of 11:11, 11 November 2026 (UTC)

Kalvin Mark Phillips (born 2 December 1995) is an English professional footballer who plays as a defensive midfielder for EFL Championship club Sheffield United on loan from Premier League club Manchester City.

An academy graduate of hometown club Leeds United, Phillips made his senior debut in 2015. In the 2019–20 season, he was a member of the Leeds team coached by Marcelo Bielsa that won the Championship. Phillips signed for Manchester City in 2022 and was part of the squad that won a continental treble of the Premier League, FA Cup, and UEFA Champions League in his debut season. He struggled for playing time at City, spending time on loan with West Ham United and Ipswich Town.

Phillips made his international debut for the England national team in 2020, and represented the country at UEFA Euro 2020, where England were runners-up, and the 2022 FIFA World Cup.

== Early life ==
Kalvin Mark Phillips was born on 2 December 1995 in Leeds, West Yorkshire. He attended the Farnley Academy during his secondary school years. Phillips was one of four children and was raised in poverty while his mother worked two jobs and his father was in prison.

== Club career ==
=== Leeds United ===
==== Early career ====
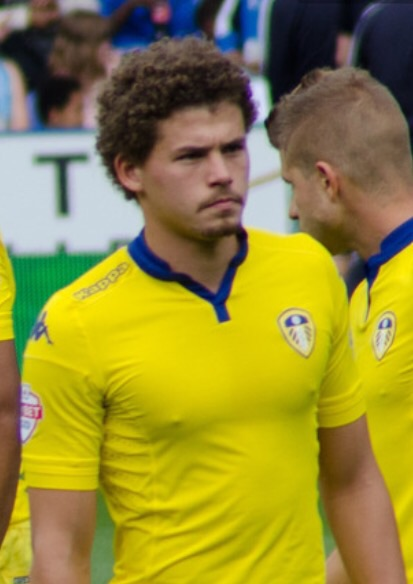
Phillips with Leeds United in 2015

Phillips played for local club Wortley from 2003 to 2010 before joining Leeds United's academy aged 14. He progressed through the club's youth ranks and signed his first professional deal with the club in the summer of 2014, retaining him for the 2014–15 season.

During the 2014–15 season, Phillips became the captain of the development and under-18 teams. Phillips joined the first team for the trip to Sunderland in the FA Cup third round on 4 January 2015; he was unused substitute in a 1–0 defeat. On 30 March, academy coach Jason Blunt said he felt Phillips would become a future fans favourite. Phillips made further appearances on the bench in league matches over the following months, and made his professional debut against Wolverhampton Wanderers in 4–3 defeat on 6 April. Along with Sam Byram, Charlie Taylor, Alex Mowatt and Lewis Cook, Phillips was the latest graduate of a promising group of academy players to regularly feature under former youth manager Neil Redfearn in the 2014–15 season. On 11 April, he retained his position in the Leeds starting 11, making his home debut against Cardiff City at Elland Road, and marked the match with his first senior goal in only his second appearance, although the match finished in a 2–1 defeat.

At the end of the season, he signed a new two-year contract. On 31 July 2015, Phillips was given the number 27 shirt for the upcoming 2015–16 season. However, with Redfearn replaced as head coach during the summer, Phillips made just 10 league appearances over the course of the season under head coaches Uwe Rösler and then Steve Evans.

==== 2016–2019 ====
In June 2016, only days after the appointment of new head coach Garry Monk, Phillips was offered a new three-year contract at Leeds. On 23 June, Phillips signed the new three-year contract extension to stay at the club until the summer of 2019. On 27 August 2016, Phillips scored his first goal of the 2016–17 season, with a long-range free kick against Nottingham Forest in a 3–1 defeat. After an injury to captain Liam Bridcutt in September 2016, Phillips, alongside Eunan O'Kane or Ronaldo Vieira, established himself as an important player in Leeds' central midfield. Phillips' impressive form for Leeds saw him win the Championship Young Player of the Month Award for October 2016. On 9 December 2016, Phillips was given his first professional red card after giving away a penalty in a 2–0 defeat against then league leaders Brighton & Hove Albion by turning away a goal-bound shot with his arm, the penalty was converted by Glenn Murray.

On 6 August 2017, the opening day of the 2017–18 Championship season, Phillips scored a brace to ensure Leeds beat Bolton Wanderers 3–2. On 9 September he scored his third goal of the season in the match against Burton Albion. His fifth of the season came on 27 October in a 2–1 defeat in the Yorkshire derby against Sheffield United. He started the season partnering O'Kane in the centre of Leeds' midfield, although after a good start to the season, Leeds suffered a lack of form prior to the dismissal of head coach Thomas Christiansen in February 2018. Phillips and O'Kane found themselves in and out the team with Vieira given more opportunities and the arrival of Adam Forshaw in January 2018. Phillips ended the season with seven goals and three assists, which represented the best scoring season of his career so far.

On 19 July 2018, Phillips revealed he had been training as a centre back and a deep-lying playmaker ahead of the 2018–19 season, as part of new head coach Marcelo Bielsa's tactics. As the season started, he was deployed as the holding midfielder in a 4–1–4–1 formation. Phillips was utilised as a deep-lying defensive midfielder for Leeds under Bielsa, playing as a centre back if the team lined up in a three-man defence. In October 2018, his impressive form in his new positions under Bielsa's management saw Phillips briefly linked with a possible call up to Gareth Southgate's England national team. After a knee injury to captain Liam Cooper on 1 December 2018 in a 1–0 win against Sheffield United, Phillips deputised several matches playing as an outright centre back until Cooper's return in mid January. After returning to his defensive midfielder position, he scored his first goal of the season in Leeds' 1–1 draw against Middlesbrough on 9 February 2019, netting the equaliser in the 11th minute of injury time. In March 2019, he was selected to the 2018–19 Championship EFL Team of the Season and on 4 May 2019, Phillips was named the Yorkshire Evening Post Player of the Year for the 2018–19 season. During the 2018–19 season, Phillips made 46 appearances in all competitions, scoring one goal, after Leeds finished the regular season in third place. Leeds qualified for the play-offs, and Phillips started the fixtures against sixth-placed Derby County. Despite Leeds taking a 1–0 win away into the home leg, Leeds lost 4–2 in the second leg, with Leeds down to 10 men after the red card of Gaetano Berardi, and saw Derby progress to the final against Aston Villa 4–3 on aggregate.

==== 2019–2022 ====
In July 2019, Leeds opened talks with Phillips over a new contract. On 8 August 2019, it was revealed that Leeds had rejected bids for Phillips during the 2019 transfer window in order to keep him at the club, with bids for Phillips rejected at around £27 million. In September 2019, he signed a new five-year contract with Leeds. On Leeds United's centenary week, Phillips scored the winning goal against Birmingham City, with the match finishing 1–0 which took place in front of another large crowd at Elland Road. In November 2019, Phillips' Leeds form in defensive midfield under Marcelo Bielsa saw calls for him to be called up to the England squad. England manager Gareth Southgate watched Phillips in January 2020 ahead of a possible call up. After the English football season was paused in March 2020 due to the impact of the COVID-19 pandemic, the season was resumed during June. Phillips would go on to score a free kick in Leeds' 3–1 win over Blackburn Rovers on 4 July 2020, however his season would be ended just a week later following a knee injury picked up in the 1–0 win over Swansea City. Despite this, Leeds would shortly go on to be promoted to the Premier League as champions when a 1–0 victory over Barnsley was followed by both West Bromwich Albion and Brentford losing their matches. On 7 August, he was named in The Guardian's Championship Team of the Season for 2019–20. On 8 September 2020, Phillips was named in the Professional Footballers' Association's 2019–20 Championship Team of the Season.

On 12 September 2020, Phillips made his first appearance in the Premier League in the opening game of the season in the 4–3 defeat against reigning Premier League champions Liverpool at Anfield, with Phillips gaining an assist for Jack Harrison's goal.

On 8 February 2021, Phillips made his 200th appearance for Leeds in a 2–0 win over Crystal Palace, joining a select group of just 70 players that have made over 200 appearances for the club, including then current teammates Stuart Dallas and Liam Cooper who also hit the milestone that season.

In the last game of the season on 23 May 2021, Phillips scored his first Premier League goal, a free kick in Leeds' 3–1 win over West Bromwich Albion.

=== Manchester City ===
==== 2022–2024 ====
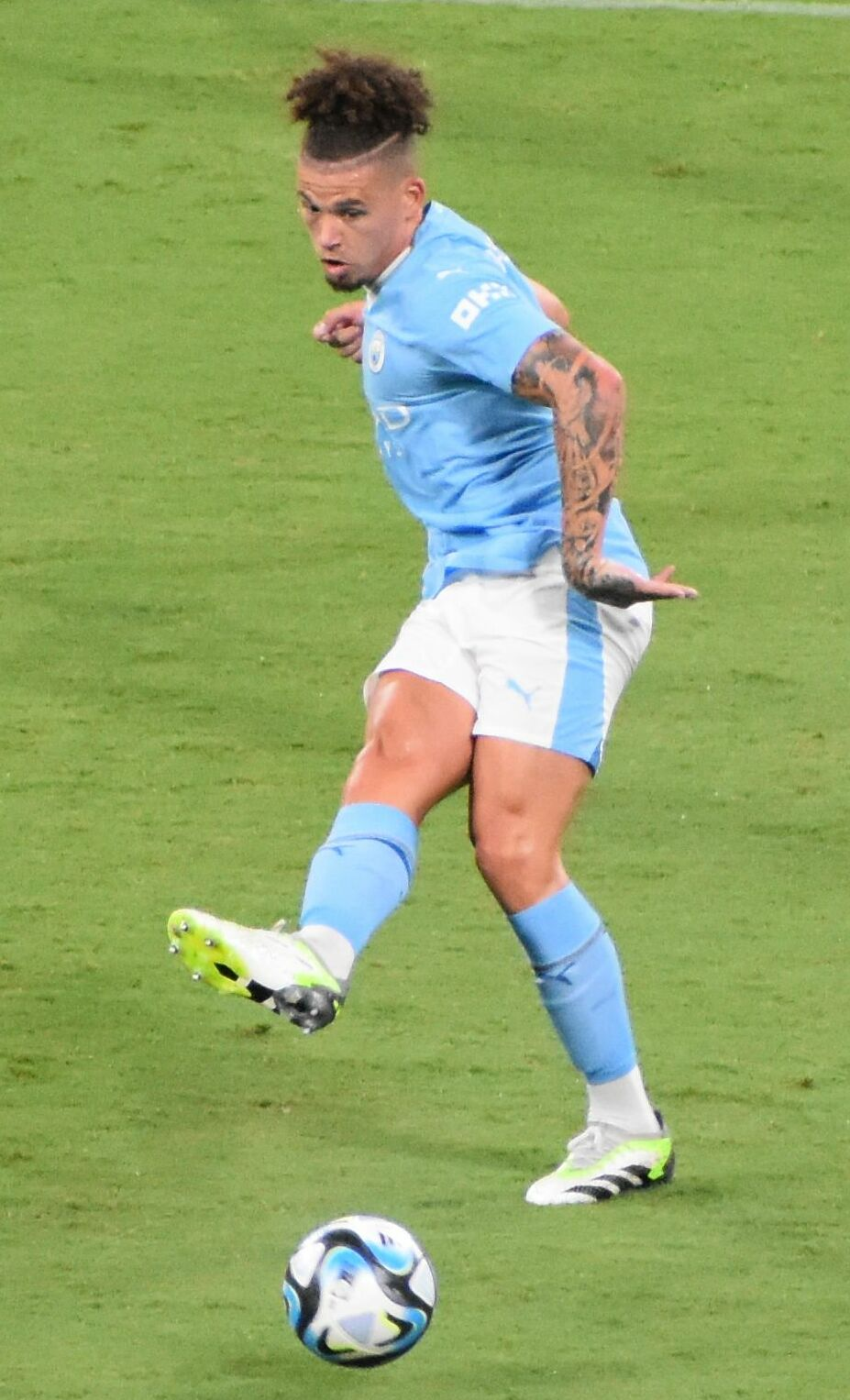
Phillips playing for Manchester City in 2023

Phillips signed for Premier League champions Manchester City on 4 July 2022 on a six-year contract, for a reported initial fee of £42 million, potentially rising to £45 million in add-ons. On 7 August, Phillips made his league debut after coming on as a substitute for Rodri in a 2–0 away win over West Ham United. Phillips though suffered from injury problems and underwent surgery on his shoulder in September. When he returned from the World Cup in mid December 2022, manager Pep Guardiola commented that Phillips was overweight. In February 2024, Guardiola apologised for the comments, saying "I do apologise to him. I'm so sorry". "I did speak about that, I never before said something here [to the media] without speaking to the player".

On 11 January 2023, Phillips started his first match for Manchester City, a 2–0 loss away to Southampton in the EFL Cup quarter-final. He made his first Premier League start in City's final home game of the season, a 1–0 win over Chelsea on 21 May.

On 13 December 2023, Phillips scored his first goal for City, with a penalty in a 3–2 victory over Red Star Belgrade in the Champions League.

==== Loans to West Ham United and Ipswich Town ====
On 26 January 2024, Phillips joined Premier League club West Ham United on loan for the remainder of the 2023–24 season. The deal did not include an option to make the move permanent. He made his West Ham debut on 1 February in a 1–1 home draw with AFC Bournemouth. His error, passing the ball to Bournemouth's Dominic Solanke, led to their opening goal in the third minute. Phillips played eight games for West Ham during his loan, three starts and five appearances as a substitute. His third game, on 11 February was West Ham's 6–0 home defeat by Arsenal, their heaviest Premier League defeat. The following week he was sent-off for two bookable offences in 2–0 away defeat to Nottingham Forest. His loan spell hit a low point on 30 March in a 4–3 away defeat by Newcastle United. With West Ham winning 3–1, Phillips gave away a penalty shortly after coming on as a substitute. After the game he was berated outside the ground by West Ham supporters, some of whom described him as "useless". His response was to show the fans his middle finger. His final game for the club was in a 5–2 away defeat by Crystal Palace on 21 April where he played the final 15 minutes. The following day, it was reported in the media that West Ham's coaches were "shocked" at Phillips's poor performances during games and attitude during training, opining that he had seemingly "lost interest in playing Premier League football".

On 16 August 2024, Phillips was loaned to newly promoted Premier League club Ipswich Town for the 2024–25 season. He made his first appearance for the Tractor Boys on 28 August 2024 at AFC Wimbledon, starting in the second round of the League Cup but was substituted at 66 minutes for Jack Taylor. Wimbledon went on to win the tie 4–2 on penalties. In November 2024, he told Sky Sports that his confidence had been eroded after not featuring for his parent club. On 2 November 2024, Phillips was sent off after receiving two yellow cards after which Ipswich Town conceded in the 94th-minute to draw against Leicester City. On 12 January 2025, Phillips scored his only goal for the club, in a FA Cup win over Bristol Rovers.

==== Return to Manchester City ====
On 24 September 2025, Phillips featured in a 2–0 away win over Huddersfield Town in the EFL Cup, making his first appearance for Manchester City in 645 days.

==== Loans to Sheffield United ====
On 2 February 2026, EFL Championship side Sheffield United announced the player would join on loan for the rest of the season. A few hours earlier, The Guardian had characterised the player's move from Leeds to Manchester City as "one of the worst, most ruinous ever made." On 21 February 2026, Phillips was sent off for a dangerous tackle in a game against Sheffield Wednesday. This was his last appearance for the club for the season after sustaining a knee injury.

On 11 August 2026, Phillips re-signed for Sheffield United on a season-long loan deal.

== International career ==
Phillips was eligible to play for his country of birth, England, as well as Jamaica and the Republic of Ireland through his heritage. He ultimately chose to represent England and was called up by Gareth Southgate for the first time in August 2020, before receiving his first cap on 8 September versus Denmark in the UEFA Nations League. He was only the fourth player in the 21st century to represent England prior to making an appearance in the top division of a country, after David Nugent, Jack Butland and Wilfried Zaha. In an interview after being called up, Phillips spoke of his intention to give his first England shirt to Marcelo Bielsa after the Leeds United manager handed him a playing shirt from his old club Newell's Old Boys, along with a message to him and his family to commemorate his first international call-up.

Phillips was chosen to represent England at UEFA Euro 2020, where he won praise from pundits, fans and the world's press for his combative, dynamic displays. He started every game that England played during the tournament all the way up to the final, where they were eventually beaten on penalties by tournament winners Italy. Phillips was named England's 2020–21 Men's Player of the Year. He made two substitute appearances at the 2022 World Cup in Qatar.

Phillips scored his only international goal on 19 June 2023 during a UEFA Euro 2024 qualifying match against North Macedonia at Old Trafford, scoring England's sixth goal after coming on as a substitute in a 7–0 victory. Leading up to Euro 2024, Phillips was dropped from the England squad in March 2024, for friendlies against Brazil and Belgium, due to a loss of form at the start of his loan to West Ham United.

== Player profile ==
=== Style of play ===
After starting his career as a box-to-box or central midfielder, Phillips was converted into a defensive midfielder by Marcelo Bielsa before the start of the 2018–19 season. He is known for his range of short sharp passing, long ball distribution and ability to start attacks whilst covering his defensive duties, with him described as a 'lynchpin'.

Phillips was also converted into playing as a centre back under Bielsa.

=== Reception ===
Marcelo Bielsa described his style "He's very good at getting the ball and putting it into another space, a better space. He's very good when he has to cover the team when our full-backs go in attack. And when we are outnumbered, he is very good with his defending."

For his similar style of play, Phillips was given the nickname "Yorkshire Pirlo" by Leeds fans in homage to Andrea Pirlo. Pirlo himself has labelled Phillips a "bit of a regista", the role for which Pirlo was highly regarded himself. Following his performance for England against Croatia at Euro 2020, he was described as "brilliant at finding little pockets of space that turn a simple passing move into a dangerous attack."

== Career statistics ==
=== Club ===
As of match played 8 September 2026

Appearances and goals by club, season and competition
Club	Season	League			FA Cup		EFL Cup		Europe		Other		Total	
Club	Season	Division	Apps	Goals	Apps	Goals	Apps	Goals	Apps	Goals	Apps	Goals	Apps	Goals
Leeds United	2014–15	Championship	2	1	0	0	0	0	—		—		2	1
Leeds United	2015–16	Championship	10	0	0	0	0	0	—		—		10	0
Leeds United	2016–17	Championship	33	1	2	0	5	0	—		—		40	1
Leeds United	2017–18	Championship	41	7	1	0	1	0	—		—		43	7
Leeds United	2018–19	Championship	42	1	0	0	2	0	—		2 (Note: Appearances in Championship play-offs)	0	46	1
Leeds United	2019–20	Championship	37	2	1	0	2	0	—		—		40	2
Leeds United	2020–21	Premier League	29	1	1	0	0	0	—		—		30	1
Leeds United	2021–22	Premier League	20	0	0	0	3	1	—		—		23	1
Leeds United	Total		214	13	5	0	13	1	—		2	0	234	14
Manchester City	2022–23	Premier League	12	0	4	0	2	0	3 (Note: Appearances in UEFA Champions League)	0	0	0	21	0
Manchester City	2023–24	Premier League	4	0	0	0	1	0	4	1	1 (Note: Appearance in FIFA Club World Cup)	0	10	1
Manchester City	2025–26	Premier League	0	0	0	0	1	0	0	0	—		1	0
Manchester City	Total		16	0	4	0	4	0	7	0	1	0	32	1
West Ham United (loan)	2023–24	Premier League	8	0	—		—		2 (Note: Appearances in UEFA Europa League)	0	—		10	0
Ipswich Town (loan)	2024–25	Premier League	19	0	2	1	1	0	—		—		22	1
Sheffield United (loan)	2025–26	Championship	3	0	—		—		—		—		3	0
Sheffield United (loan)	2026–27	Championship	4	0	0	0	1	0	—		—		5	0
Sheffield United (loan)	Sheffield United Total		7	0	0	0	1	0	0	0	0	0	8	0
Career total			264	13	11	1	19	1	9	1	3	0	306	16

=== International ===
As of match played 20 November 2023

Appearances and goals by national team and year
National team	Year	Apps	Goals
England	2020	4	0
England	2021	15	0
England	2022	6	0
England	2023	6	1
Total		31	1

As of match played 20 November 2023
England score listed first, score column indicates score after each Phillips goal

List of international goals scored by Kalvin Phillips
No.	Date	Venue	Cap	Opponent	Score	Result	Competition	Ref.
1	19 June 2023	Old Trafford, Manchester, England	27	North Macedonia	6–0	7–0	UEFA Euro 2024 qualifying	

== Honours ==
Leeds United

- EFL Championship: 2019–20

Manchester City

- Premier League: 2022–23
- FA Cup: 2022–23
- FA Community Shield: 2024
- UEFA Champions League: 2022–23
- UEFA Super Cup: 2023
- FIFA Club World Cup: 2023

England

- UEFA European Championship runner-up: 2020

Individual

- EFL Young Player of the Month: October 2016
- EFL Championship Team of the Year: 2018–19
- PFA Team of the Year: 2019–20 Championship
- England Men's Player of the Year: 2020–21
