= Hadi Sacko =

Footballer (born 1994)

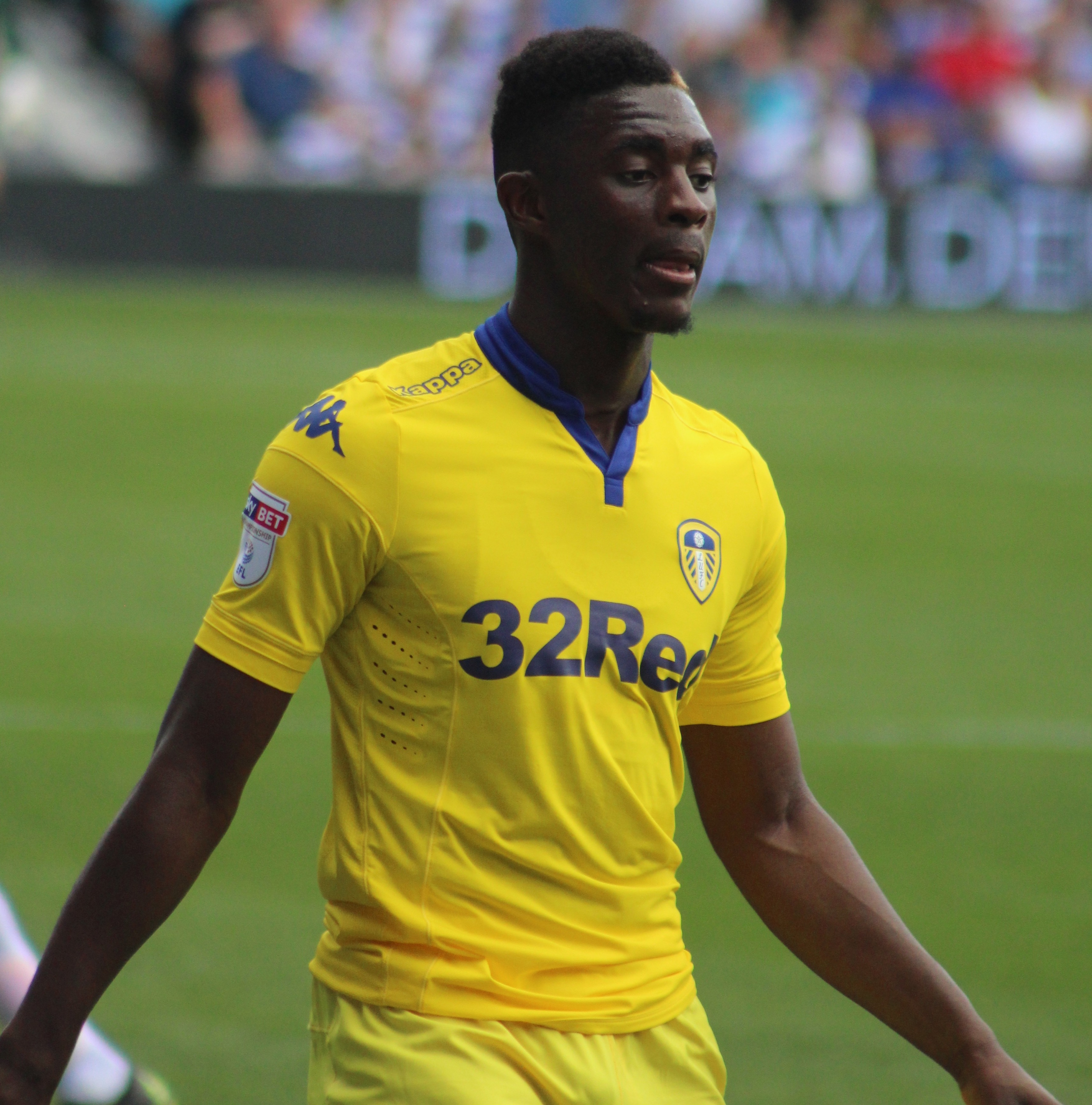
- Sacko playing for Leeds United in 2016

Personal information
- Date of birth: 24 March 1994 (age 32)
- Place of birth: Corbeil-Essonnes, France
- Height: 1.83 m (6 ft 0 in)
- Position: Winger

Team information
- Current team: Sakaryaspor
- Number: 25

Youth career
- 2003–2006: Corbeil-Essonne
- 2006–2010: Brétigny Foot
- 2010–2012: Bordeaux

Senior career*
Years	Team	Apps	(Gls)
2011–2013	Bordeaux B	18	(9)
2012–2014	Bordeaux	11	(0)
2014	→ Le Havre (loan)	18	(4)
2014–2017	Sporting CP	0	(0)
2014–2016	Sporting CP B	55	(10)
2016	→ Sochaux (loan)	12	(1)
2016–2017	→ Leeds United (loan)	42	(2)
2017–2019	Leeds United	18	(1)
2018–2019	→ Las Palmas (loan)	5	(0)
2019	→ Ankaragücü (loan)	15	(3)
2019–2021	Denizlispor	55	(5)
2021–2022	CFR Cluj	8	(0)
2022–2023	Adanaspor	12	(3)
2023–	Sakaryaspor	6	(0)

International career^{‡}
2010	France U16	3	(1)
2011–2012	France U18	7	(3)
2012–2013	France U19	10	(2)
2013–2014	France U20	10	(2)
2018–	Mali	5	(0)
- * Club domestic league appearances and goals as of 13 June 2023 ‡ National team caps and goals as of 11 November 2019

Hadi Sacko (born 24 March 1994) is a professional footballer who plays as a winger for Turkish club Sakaryaspor. Born in France, he plays for the Mali national team, having made his debut in 2018. He is a former French youth international.

== Club career ==
=== Bordeaux ===
Sacko was born in Corbeil-Essonnes, Essonne. On 31 May 2012, he signed his first professional contract at Bordeaux agreeing to a three-year deal. He was subsequently promoted to the senior team by manager Francis Gillot ahead of the 2012–13 season and assigned the number 12 shirt. He made his professional debut on 20 September 2012 in a UEFA Europa League group stage match against Belgian club Club Brugge.

He was loaned in January 2014 to Ligue 2 side Le Havre, for the remainder of the season.

=== Sporting CP ===
On 28 August 2014, Sacko joined Sporting CP on a six-year contract, with the club stipulating a 60 million euro release clause in his contract.

On 1 February 2016, after scoring 10 goals in 54 games for Sporting CP B and failing to break into the Sporting first team bar one cup appearance, Sacko joined Ligue 2 side Sochaux on loan and scored two goals in 14 appearances whilst on loan.

==== Loan to Leeds United ====
On 5 July 2016, Sacko joined Leeds United on a season-long loan, with a view to a permanent transfer. He was given the squad number 24 shirt for the 2016–17 season. On 7 August, Sacko made his Leeds debut as a substitute against QPR in a 3–0 defeat. He made his first start for Leeds on 10 August in a League Cup victory on penalties against Fleetwood Town. Sacko scored his first goal for Leeds in a 2–1 loss to Birmingham City on 13 August 2016.

He impressed in his early games for Leeds, which also included assists in wins against Sheffield Wednesday and Blackburn Rovers. Sacko scored his second goal for Leeds in a 4–1 victory against Preston North End on 26 December 2016.

After making 38 league appearances and scoring two goals, he returned to Sporting Lisbon after his loan to Leeds had expired.

=== Leeds United ===
On 2 June 2017, Sacko signed a permanent deal with Leeds for an undisclosed fee believed to be £1.5 million to take him up until at least the end of the 2019/20 season. Despite the resignation of head coach Garry Monk, he was the first signing under new owner Andrea Radrizzani.

On 6 August 2017, Sacko made his Leeds United debut as a permanent player in a 3–2 victory at Bolton Wanderers. On 19 September, after a spell out the side, Sacko made a scoring return for Leeds scoring the opening goal of the game, in their League Cup tie against Premier League side Burnley in a penalty shootout victory after a 2–2 draw.

With speculation that he was not in Marcelo Bielsa's plans, on 26 July 2018, Sacko was not given a shirt number for Leeds for the upcoming 2018–19 season for Leeds.

==== Loan to Las Palmas ====
On 30 July 2018, Sacko joined Segunda División side UD Las Palmas on a season-long loan from Leeds. He made his debut on 19 August 2018 in a 2–0 win against CF Reus Deportiu. On 25 January 2019, UD Las Palmas announced a termination of his loan spell.

==== Loan to Ankaragücü ====
On 29 January 2019, Sacko joined Turkish Süper Lig side Ankaragücü on a 6-month loan. With the club unveiling Sacko with him as a mocked up picture of him as Marvel superhero 'Falcon'.

He scored his first goal for the club on 11 February with a long range striker against Kasimpasa S.K. In total he made 15 appearances for Ankaragücü scoring 3 goals in Süper Lig, helping them avoid relegation.

=== Denizlispor ===
On 16 July 2019, Sacko joined Turkish Süper Lig side Denizlispor.

=== CFR Cluj ===
On 24 September 2021, Sacko joined Romanian Liga I side CFR Cluj.

== International career ==
=== France youth sides ===
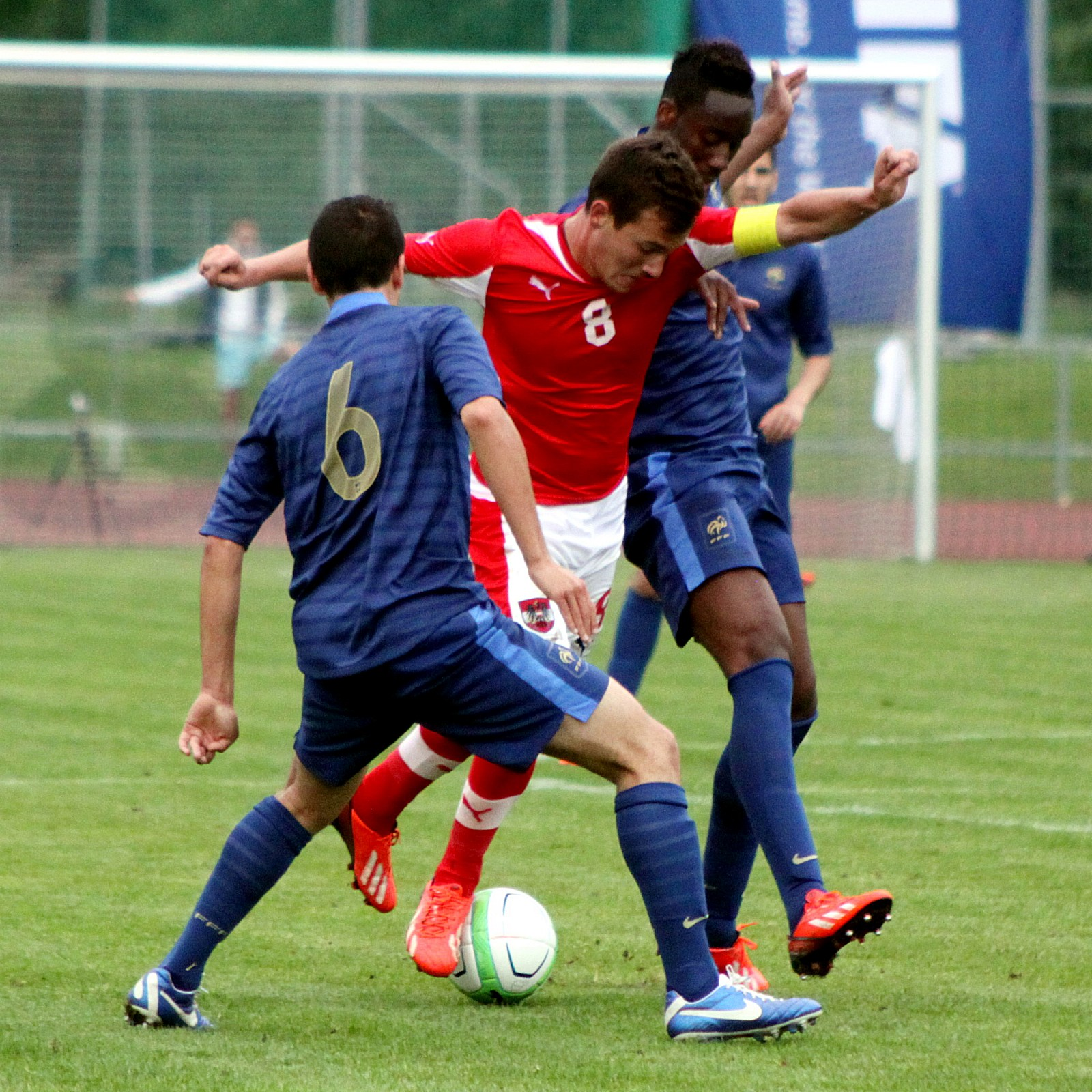
Hadi Sacko (right) playing for France U16 in 2010

Of Malian descent, Sacko has represented France and represented his nation of birth at under-16, under-18, and under-19 and under-20 level.

=== Mali senior team ===
After not playing for France senior team (in a competitive game), Sacko was still eligible to play for Mali.

On 15 March 2018, Sacko was called up the senior Mali national team for a friendly against Japan. On 23 March 2018, he made his debut for Mali coming on as a substitute replacing AS Monaco's Adama Traoré in the final 13 minutes in a 1–1 draw against Japan.

== Career statistics ==
=== Club ===
As of match played 11 September 2022

Appearances and goals by club, season and competition
Club	Season	League			National Cup		League Cup		Other		Total	
Club	Season	Division	Apps	Goals	Apps	Goals	Apps	Goals	Apps	Goals	Apps	Goals
Bordeaux B	2011–12	CFA	5	3	—		—		—		5	3
Bordeaux B	2012–13	CFA	10	5	—		—		—		10	5
Bordeaux B	2013–14	CFA	3	1	—		—		—		3	1
Bordeaux B	Total		18	9	—		—		—		18	9
Bordeaux	2012–13	Ligue 1	4	0	1	0	0	0	5 (Note: Appearances in the Europa League)	0	10	0
Bordeaux	2013–14	Ligue 1	5	0	1	0	0	0	5 (Note: One appearance in the Trophée des Champions and four in the Europa League)	0	11	0
Bordeaux	2014–15	Ligue 1	2	0	0	0	0	0	—		2	0
Bordeaux	Total		11	0	2	0	0	0	10	0	23	0
Le Havre (loan)	2013–14	Ligue 2	18	4	0	0	0	0	—		18	4
Sporting CP B	2014–15	LigaPro	31	7	0	0	—		—		31	7
Sporting CP B	2015–16	LigaPro	24	3	0	0	—		—		24	3
Sporting CP B	Total		55	10	0	0	—		—		55	10
Sporting CP	2014–15	Primeira Liga	0	0	0	0	4	0	0	0	4	0
Sochaux (loan)	2015–16	Ligue 2	12	1	2	1	0	0	—		14	2
Leeds United (loan)	2016–17	Championship	38	2	1	0	3	0	—		42	2
Leeds United	2017–18	Championship	14	0	1	0	3	1	—		18	1
Las Palmas (loan)	2018–19	Segunda División	5	0	0	0	—		—		5	0
Ankaragücü (loan)	2018–19	Süper Lig	15	3	0	0	—		—		15	3
Denizlispor	2019–20	Süper Lig	28	3	4	1	—		—		32	4
Denizlispor	2020–21	Süper Lig	27	2	1	0	—		—		28	2
Denizlispor	Total		55	5	5	1	—		—		60	6
CFR Cluj	2021–22	Liga I	8	0	—		—		—		8	0
Adanaspor	2022–23	TFF First League	5	1	0	0	—		—		5	1
Career total			254	35	11	2	10	1	10	0	285	38

=== International ===
As of match played on 11 November 2019

Appearances and goals by national team and year
National team	Year	Apps	Goals
Mali	2018	3	0
Mali	2019	2	0
Total		5	0

== Honours ==
Bordeaux

- Coupe de France: 2012–13

CFR Cluj

- Liga I: 2021–22
- Supercupa României runner-up: 2022

France U19

- UEFA European Under-19 Championship runner-up: 2013

France U21

- Toulon Tournament runner-up: 2014
