= Alex Purver =

English footballer (born 1995)

Personal information
- Full name: Alex William Purver
- Date of birth: 1 December 1995 (age 30)
- Place of birth: Leeds, England
- Height: 5 ft 10 in (1.77 m)
- Position: Midfielder

Team information
- Current team: Scarborough Athletic

Youth career
- 2002–2016: Leeds United

Senior career*
Years	Team	Apps	(Gls)
2016–2017	Leeds United	0	(0)
2016–2017	→ Guiseley (loan)	21	(2)
2017	→ Guiseley (loan)	5	(0)
2017–2019	Guiseley	69	(5)
2019–2020	Östersund	8	(0)
2021–2023	Darlington	81	(3)
2023–	Scarborough Athletic	81	(1)
- * Club domestic league appearances and goals as of 11:51, 16 April 2025 (UTC)

Alex William Purver (born 1 December 1995) is an English professional footballer who plays as a midfielder for National League North club Scarborough Athletic.

Purver began his football career with home-town club Leeds United as a six-year-old, progressed through the academy to captain their under-21 team, but left in 2017 for National League club Guiseley, where he had already spent two spells on loan. Two years later, he signed professional terms for Östersund, for which he made eight Allsvenskan appearances over an 18-month contract. He returned to England and spent two seasons with Darlington before joining another National League North club, Scarborough Athletic, in 2023.

== Life and career ==
Purver was born in 1995 in Leeds. He joined Leeds United's academy as a six-year-old, took up a two-year scholarship in 2012, and in his first season as a scholar, was a regular in the under-18 side that won the U18 Professional Development League North Division – their record included a 12-match unbeaten run – and reached the fifth round of the FA Youth Cup. Purver signed a one-year professional contract in 2014, and was given a first-team squad number. He regularly captained their under-21 team in 2014–15, although he played less in his preferred position of central midfielder than he did filling in at right back or elsewhere, and travelled with Neil Redfearn's squad for a Championship match at Birmingham City, but was not in the matchday 18.

Purver's contract was extended for a further year in 2015, and again in 2016, when he played in first-team pre-season friendlies, and then went on loan to Guiseley to gain experience of competitive men's football. He was a regular in the team, playing 21 National League matches and scoring twice before returning to his parent club in January 2017. Having had no further involvement with Leeds' first team, Purver rejoined Guiseley in March on loan to the end of the season, before joining the club permanently on 1 August 2017 after his release from Leeds.

He began the new season in the Guiseley team, but his progress was disrupted by a combination of a heavy defeat at Leyton Orient on 2 September in which he conceded two penalties, a change of management and a hamstring injury, and he did not return to the side until late November. Against a background of "constant chopping and changing" of players and a second managerial dismissal, Purver finished the season with 28 league appearances, mainly as a starter, as Guiseley were relegated to the National League North. He was one of just nine players retained, and missed only one match in all competitions over the 2018–19 season. He helped Guiseley progress from the second qualifying round of the FA Cup to the second round proper. In the first round, Guiseley took a 4–0 lead before League Two opponents Cambridge United scored three times to produce a nervy finish. In the second round, defensive errors helped Fleetwood Town of League One score twice in three minutes; within two minutes, Purver returned the goalkeeper's poor clearance back over his head and into the net from 25 yards (23 m) to reduce the deficit, but Guiseley were unable to find an equaliser.

At the end of the season, Purver was invited for a trial with Swedish club Östersunds FK. The trial was successful, and in July 2019 he signed an 18-month deal. He made his debut for Östersund on 21 July, playing the whole of a 3–0 loss to Norrköping in the Allsvenskan. He made eight Allsvenskan appearances before leaving the club when his contract expired. While playing semi-professionally for Guiseley, Purver had coached at the Leeds United academy, and after he joined Östersund, he set up a coaching programme for individuals and small groups in the city.

After returning to England, Purver trained with Hartlepool United with the intention of signing a short-term deal, but the uncertainty caused by the COVID-19 pandemic meant he was unable to find a new club. On 5 July 2021, he signed for Darlington of the National League North. He made his debut as a first-half substitute in Darlington's first match of the season, a 3–2 defeat at home to Alfreton Town.

He played in every match in all competitions in the 2022–23 season – all but two as a starter – and won both the Darlington Supporters' and Players' Player of the Year awards.

In May 2023, he joined National League North rivals Scarborough Athletic.

== Career statistics ==
As of match played 12 April 2025

Appearances and goals by club, season and competition
Club	Season	League			National cup (Note: Includes FA Cup, Svenska Cupen)		Other		Total	
Club	Season	Division	Apps	Goals	Apps	Goals	Apps	Goals	Apps	Goals
Leeds United	2016–17	Championship	0	0	—		—		0	0
Guiseley (loan)	2016–17	National League	26	2	2	0	1 (Note: Appearance(s) in FA Trophy)	0	29	2
Guiseley	2017–18	National League	28	2	1	0	1	0	30	2
Guiseley	2018–19	National League North	41	3	6	1	2	0	49	4
Guiseley	Total		95	7	9	1	4	0	108	8
Östersund	2019	Allsvenskan	3	0	1	0	—		4	0
Östersund	2020	Allsvenskan	5	0	1	0	—		6	0
Östersund	Total		8	0	2	0	—		10	0
Darlington	2021–22	National League North	35	1	2	0	1	0	38	1
Darlington	2022–23	National League North	46	2	2	0	3	0	51	2
Darlington	Total		81	3	4	0	4	0	89	3
Scarborough Athletic	2023–24	National League North	43	0	6	0	1	0	50	0
Scarborough Athletic	2024–25	National League North	38	1	4	0	1	0	46	1
Scarborough Athletic	Total		81	1	10	0	2	0	93	1
Career total			265	11	25	1	10	0	300	12

== Honours ==
Individual

- Darlington Supporters' Player of the Year: 2022–23
- Darlington Players' Player of the Year: 2022–23
