= Billy Whitehouse =

English footballer

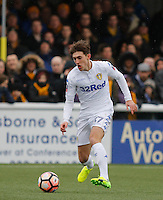
- Whitehouse playing for Leeds United in January 2017

Personal information
- Full name: Billy Haywood Whitehouse
- Date of birth: 13 June 1996 (age 30)
- Place of birth: Mexborough, England
- Height: 5 ft 11 in (1.80 m)
- Position: Winger

Team information
- Current team: Chorley

Youth career
- 2010–2014: Doncaster Rovers

Senior career*
Years	Team	Apps	(Gls)
2014–2016	Doncaster Rovers	11	(0)
2014	→ FC Halifax Town (loan)	3	(1)
2016–2017	Leeds United	1	(0)
2016–2017	→ Guiseley (loan)	1	(0)
2017	Alfreton Town	3	(0)
2017–2018	Shaw Lane		
2018–2019	Tadcaster Albion	35	(15)
2019–2021	The New Saints	17	(5)
2020	→ Spennymoor Town (loan)	2	(0)
2021–2024	Chorley	128	(11)
2024–2025	Alfreton Town	27	(1)
2025	Chorley	16	(0)
2025–2026	Cleethorpes Town	0	(0)
2026–	Chorley	0	(0)
- * Club domestic league appearances and goals as of 23:18, 29 April 2024 (UTC)

Billy Haywood Whitehouse (born 13 June 1996) is an English professional footballer who plays as a winger or full back for National League North club Chorley.

He turned professional at Doncaster Rovers in May 2014, and made his first team debut five months later at 18 years of age. He was loaned out to FC Halifax Town in February 2016, before he was bought by Leeds United for a fee rumoured to be around £400,000 in August 2016, he was named man of the match in his last game for Doncaster. He had a brief spell on loan at Guiseley, before he was released by Leeds in May 2017.

After brief trials at Port Vale and Shamrock Rovers, Billy signed for Tadcaster Albion in December 2018. The following year after a good start to the season - the likes of Leicester, Cardiff, Bournemouth and Reading enquired about his availability, he finished the season on 34 assists and 12 goals. Billy signed for The New Saints for an undisclosed fee in January 2019.

== Career ==
=== Doncaster Rovers ===
Whitehouse came through Doncaster Rovers's youth system to sign his first professional contract in May 2014. He made his first team debut after coming on as a 90th-minute substitute in a 3–0 away victory over Burton Albion in the League Trophy on 7 October 2014. He earned his first start in the next round of the competition, in a 1–0 defeat to Notts County at the Keepmoat Stadium on 18 November; after the game manager Paul Dickov praised his performance. He played a total of nine games during the 2014–15 campaign.

Speaking in November 2015, new manager Darren Ferguson said that he would try to arrange a loan move for Whitehouse after he went nine weeks without a first team appearance. On 13 February 2016, Whitehouse joined National League side FC Halifax Town on a one-month loan. He scored on his debut seven days later in a 4–2 victory over Grimsby Town at The Shay, a win which lifted the "Shaymen" out of the relegation zone. However Jim Harvey played him only twice more before the loan deal expired. Whitehouse played only five games for "Donny" during the 2015–16 relegation campaign and Ferguson confirmed that Whitehouse would remain transfer-listed as he did not see the midfielder having a future at the club.

=== Leeds United ===
On 2 August 2016, Whitehouse signed a one-year contract with EFL Championship club Leeds United for an undisclosed fee, and initially joined the Development squad. On 21 September, he joined Adam Lockwood's Guiseley on a three-month loan so as to provide cover for injured full-backs Danny East and Javan Vidal. Three days later he played in a 2–1 defeat to Macclesfield Town at Nethermoor Park – this was to prove his only appearance for the "Lions". He returned to Elland Road and on 29 January 2017, Whitehouse made his United debut in a 1–0 defeat to non-league Sutton United in the FA Cup. He did not feature again under manager Garry Monk and was released at the end of the 2016–17 season.

=== English non-league ===
Whitehouse then had a brief spells at Alfreton Town and later Shaw Lane in the Northern Premier League before joining Tadcaster Albion in January 2018.

=== The New Saints ===
In January 2019 he returned to full-time professional football in the Welsh Premier League when he joined The New Saints. He came off the bench in the Europa League tie against Ludogorets & was on the bench against Copenhagen the previous round. His first start of the 2019–2020 season resulted in a hat-trick away to Aberystwyth.

In February 2020 he joined Spennymoor Town on loan until the end of the season.

He left TNS by mutual consent at the end of March 2021.

=== Chorley ===
In May 2021, he was snapped up as a free agent by National League North side Chorley, becoming the first signing of the summer. On 6 May 2024 Chorley announced Whitehouse would depart at the end of the season.

=== Alfreton Town ===
On 2 July 2024, Whitehouse rejoined National League North club Alfreton Town.

=== Return to Chorley ===
In March 2025, Whitehouse returned to Chorley on a short-term deal until the end of the season.

=== Cleethorpes Town ===
In October 2025, Whitehouse joined Northern Premier League Premier Division club Cleethorpes Town.

=== Second return to Chorley ===
In May 2026, Whitehouse returned to Chorley for a second time.

== Style of play ==
A two footed tricky winger who takes set pieces with both feet and can also play full-back. Leeds United development coach Jason Blunt said that Whitehouse "A player of immense skill, talent and potential who also creates chances and his work ethic and professional attitude and mentally is of the highest level expected from such a talent ".

== Career statistics ==
As of 1 July 2017.

Appearances and goals by club, season and competition
Club	Season	League			FA Cup		EFL Cup		Other		Total	
Club	Season	Division	Apps	Goals	Apps	Goals	Apps	Goals	Apps	Goals	Apps	Goals
Doncaster Rovers	2014–15	League One	4	0	1	0	0	0	2 (Note: Includes appearance/s in EFL Trophy.)	0	7	0
Doncaster Rovers	2015–16	League One	2	0	0	0	1	0	1	0	4	0
Doncaster Rovers	Total		6	0	1	0	1	0	4	0	12	0
FC Halifax Town (loan)	2015–16	National League	2	1	0	0	0	0	1 (Note: Includes appearance/s in FA Trophy.)	0	3	1
Leeds United	2016–17	EFL Championship	0	0	1	0	0	0	0	0	1	0
Guiseley (loan)	2016–17	National League	1	0	0	0	0	0	0	0	1	0
Career total			15	1	2	0	1	0	4	0	22	1
