= 2015–16 Leeds United F.C. season =

2015–16 season of Leeds United

Leeds United
2015–16 season
- Chairman: Massimo Cellino
- Head coach: Uwe Rösler (until 19 October); Steve Evans (from 19 October)
- Stadium: Elland Road
- Championship: 13th
- FA Cup: Fifth round
- League Cup: First round
- Top goalscorer: League: Chris Wood (13); All: Chris Wood (13)
- Highest home attendance: 29,311 vs Huddersfield Town (19 March 2016, Championship)
- Lowest home attendance: 16,039 vs Rotherham United (9 January 2016, FA Cup)
- Average home league attendance: 21,667
Home colours	Away colours

The 2015–16 season saw Leeds United competing in the Championship (known as the Sky Bet Championship for sponsorship reasons) for a sixth successive season.

== Season summary ==
With Neil Redfearn having been sacked as manager in the summer, owner Massimo Cellino turned to Uwe Rösler, who had experienced some success with Brentford, but had been sacked as manager of then-Championship rivals Wigan Athletic in the middle of an ultimately unsuccessful relegation struggle the previous season. The summer also saw few signings of note being made, and a host of departures, including Billy Sharp, who had heavily underwhelmed by scoring just five goals in the previous season, and dropped down a division to return to former club Sheffield United.

As had become increasingly typical in recent years, Rösler had precious little time in charge of Leeds, and was sacked after winning just two of his first ten league matches (albeit five of them had ended in draws). He was replaced by Steve Evans, who had recently been sacked by Yorkshire rivals Rotherham United, and while the club's form initially remained unimpressive, results did eventually pick up. However, Leeds were too inconsistent to produce anything better than a season of mid-table mediocrity, with the only saving grace being that even this was better than most of their recent seasons. Among the few positives of the campaign were the form of newly-recruited New Zealander Chris Wood, who would prove Leeds' top scorer this year. Additionally, the relative lack of new signings and an injury crisis forced Evans to fall back on several youngsters, including Kalvin Phillips, who would become key figures in the side in the years ahead. Evans would not last long enough to see the fruits of this, however, as for the third season in succession, Leeds sacked their manager after the season ended.

== Events ==
This is a list of the significant events to occur at the club during the 2014–15 season, presented in chronological order, starting on 2 May 2015 and ending on the final day of the club's final match in the 2015–16 season. This list does not include transfers or new contracts, which are listed in the transfers section below, or match results, which are in the results section.

=== May ===
- 7 May: Massimo Cellino has been granted Football League permission to return to the club's board, taking up the role as Leeds United chairman with immediate effect after passing the League's Owners and Directors Test.
- 11 May: Adam Pearson returns to the club as executive director, to assist Massimo Cellino.
- 12 May: The Financial Fair Play transfer embargo imposed upon the club in December is lifted for the 2015 summer transfer window, with no club now under no restrictions in relation to buying or selling players.
- 20 May: Uwe Rösler is named as the club's new head coach on a two-year deal.

=== June ===
- 3 June: Rob Kelly is named assistant head coach, penning a two-year deal.
- 9 June: Richard Hartis becomes the club's new goalkeeping coach. As a result of this move, Neil Sullivan returned to his previous role the Academy, coaching the Under-21s and U18s.
- 15 June: Martyn Glover joins the club from West Ham United as the new head of recruitment. The club also confirmed that Stuart Hayton had joined the previous week from Liverpool as the new club secretary.
- 16 June: The club announce a five-year deal with Italian sportswear giants Kappa to become the club's new kit provider from the 2015/16 season onwards.
- 24 June: The club reach a mutual agreement with Nicola Salerno for him to depart from his role as Sporting Director.

=== July ===
- 2 July: Julian Darby joins the backroom staff as a first-team coach.
- 13 July: Leeds re-purchase the catering and beverage rights for Elland Road and the Centenary Pavilion, ending a period where it had been outsourced after being sold in June 2012.
- 13 July: Global Autocare are announced as the club's official South Stand Sponsor and Vehicle Partner for the next three years in a record-breaking partnership.
- 16 July: Neil Redfearn resigns from academy position, claiming the club made his position "untenable".

=== August ===
- 4 August: Sol Bamba is named as the club's captain for the 2015/16 season.
- 21 August: The club announce a partnership with bookmakers CORAL, who will become the club's official betting and gaming partner, as well as sponsoring the North East Corner Stand of Elland Road.

=== September ===
- 4 September: Paul Hart returns as the club's new Head of Academy.
- 15 September: Adam Pearson departs from his role as executive director.

=== October ===
- 19 October: Uwe Rösler and the club part ways, with Rösler departing from his position as head coach. Assistant manager Rob Kelly and first-team coach Julian Darby have been placed on gardening leave.
  Steve Evans is appointed as head coach, on a rolling contract until 30 June 2016, with Paul Raynor joining as assistant coach.

== First-team squad ==
=== Squad information ===
N	Pos.	Nat.	Name	Age	Since	App	Goals	Ends	Transfer fee	Notes
1	GK	(Italy)	Marco Silvestri	25	2014	92	0	2018	£450,000	
3	DF	(Ivory Coast)	Sol Bamba	31	2015 (Winter)	52	5	2017	£1,000,000	Club Captain
4	DF	(England)	Scott Wootton	24	2013	73	1	2017	£1,000,000	
5	DF	(Italy)	Giuseppe Bellusci	26	2014	60	2	2018	£1,600,000	
6	DF	(Scotland)	Liam Cooper	24	2014	72	2	2017	£600,000	
7	FW	(Italy)	Mirco Antenucci	31	2014	80	19	2016	£440,000	
8	MF	(England)	Luke Murphy	26	2013	110	7	2019	£1,000,000	
9	FW	(New Zealand)	Chris Wood	24	2015	37	13	2019	£3,000,000	
10	MF	(England)	Alex Mowatt	21	2013	105	12	2017	Youth system	
11	FW	(Senegal)	Souleymane Doukara	24	2014	54	12	2017	£1,500,000	
14	MF	(Italy)	Tommaso Bianchi	27	2014	26	0	2018	£500,000	On loan to Ascoli
15	MF	(Northern Ireland)	Stuart Dallas	25	2015	49	5	2018	£1,300,000	
16	MF	(France)	Toumani Diagouraga	28	2016 (Winter)	19	3	2018	£600,000	
18	MF	(The Gambia)	Mustapha Carayol	27	2016 (Winter)	14	2	2016	Loan	On loan from Middlesbrough
19	FW	(Scotland)	Lee Erwin	22	2015	12	0	2018	Free	
20	FW	(Netherlands) (Democratic Republic of the Congo)	Jordan Botaka	22	2015	14	0	2017	£1,000,000	
21	DF	(England)	Charlie Taylor	22	2011	72	3	2017	Youth system	
22	GK	(England)	Ross Turnbull	31	2015	1	0	2017	Free	
23	MF	(England)	Lewis Cook	19	2014	85	2	2017	Youth system	
24	MF	(England)	Tom Adeyemi	24	2015	24	2	2016	Loan	On loan from Cardiff City
26	MF	(Scotland) (England)	Liam Bridcutt	26	2015	27	0	2016	Loan	On loan from Sunderland
27	MF	(England)	Kalvin Phillips	20	2014	12	1	2017	Youth system	
28	DF	(Switzerland)	Gaetano Berardi	27	2014	53	0	2018	£250,000	
29	MF	(Denmark)	Casper Sloth	24	2014	14	0	2017	£600,000	
31	DF	(England)	Lewie Coyle	20	2014	13	0	2017	Youth system	
37	MF	(Guinea-Bissau)	Ronaldo Vieira	17	2016	1	0	2018	Youth system	
41	GK	(Republic of Ireland)	Eric Grimes	21	2013	0	0	2016	Youth system	
45	GK	(England)	Bailey Peacock-Farrell	19	2015	1	0	2016	Youth system	

- Last updated: 7 May 2016
- Source: Wikipedia players' articles, Leeds United, Sky Sports
- Ordered by Squad Number.

Appearances (starts and substitute appearances) and goals include those in the Championship (and playoffs), League One (and playoffs), FA Cup, League Cup and Football League Trophy.

== Transfers ==
=== In ===
Date	Pos.	Name	From	Fee	Ref.
9 June 2015	GK	Charlie Horton (USA)	Cardiff City	Free transfer	
10 June 2015	FW	Lee Erwin (SCO)	Motherwell	Free transfer	
24 June 2015	DF	Sol Bamba (CIV)	Palermo	£1,000,000	
1 July 2015	FW	Chris Wood (NZL)	Leicester City	£3,000,000	
15 July 2015	GK	Ross Turnbull (ENG)	Barnsley	Free transfer	
4 August 2015	MF	Stuart Dallas (NIR)	Brentford	£1,300,000	
1 September 2015	FW	Jordan Botaka (NED)	Excelsior	£1,000,000	
11 January 2016	FW	Jack McKay (SCO)	Doncaster Rovers	Undisclosed	
11 January 2016	DF	Paul McKay (SCO)	Doncaster Rovers	Undisclosed	
25 January 2016	MF	Toumani Diagouraga (FRA)	Brentford	£600,000	

=== Loans in ===
Start date	Position	Name	From	End date	Ref.
14 July 2015	MF	Tom Adeyemi (ENG)	Cardiff City	31 May 2016	
2 October 2015	MF	Will Buckley (ENG)	Sunderland	26 November 2015	
26 November 2015	MF	Liam Bridcutt (SCO)	Sunderland	31 May 2016	
8 January 2016	MF	Mustapha Carayol (GAM)	Middlesbrough	31 May 2016	

=== Loans out ===
Start date	Position	Name	To	End date	Ref.
9 October 2015	FW	Lee Erwin (SCO)	Bury	5 November 2015	
6 November 2015	DF	Ross Killock (ENG)	Stockport County	6 January 2016	
6 January 2016	FW	Robbie McDaid (NIR)	Lincoln City	31 May 2016	
28 January 2016	MF	Tommaso Bianchi (ITA)	Ascoli	31 May 2016	

=== Transfers out ===
Date	Position	Name	To	Fee	Ref.
30 June 2015	GK	Daniel Atkinson (ENG)	Guiseley	Released	
30 June 2015	DF	Isaac Assenso (ENG)	Scunthorpe United	Released	
30 June 2015	MF	Rodolph Austin (JAM)	Brøndby	Released	
30 June 2015	DF	Luke Booker (ENG)	Sheffield Wednesday	Released	
30 June 2015	DF	Afolabi Coker (ENG)	Norwich City	Released	
30 June 2015	GK	Alex Cairns (ENG)	Chesterfield	Released	
30 June 2015	GK	Stuart Taylor (ENG)		Released	
30 June 2015	MF	Zac Thompson (ENG)	Guiseley	Released	
30 June 2015	MF	Michael Tonge (ENG)	Stevenage	Released	
30 June 2015	MF	Aidan White (IRL)	Rotherham United	Released	
25 July 2015	FW	Billy Sharp (ENG)	Sheffield United	£500,000	
4 August 2015	FW	Steve Morison (WAL)	Millwall	Free transfer	
2 September 2015	FW	Nicky Ajose (NGA)	Swindon Town	Contract termination	
23 November 2015	GK	Charlie Horton (USA)	D.C. United	Contract termination	
20 January 2016	DF	Sam Byram (ENG)	West Ham United	Undisclosed	
26 January 2016	MF	Chris Dawson (WAL)	Rotherham United	Contract termination	
31 March 2016	FW	Luke Parkin (ENG)		Contract termination	

=== New contracts ===
No.	Pos.	Nat.	Name	Age	Status	Contract length	Expiry date	Source
23	MF	(England)	Lewis Cook	29	Signed	2 years	June 2017	
	DF	(England)	Lewie Coyle	31	Signed	1 year	June 2016	
	DF	(England)	Tyler Denton	31	Signed	1 year	June 2016	
	GK	(Republic of Ireland)	Eric Grimes	31	Signed	1 year	June 2016	
39	FW	(England)	Luke Parkin	31	Signed	1 year	June 2016	
40	MF	(England)	Kalvin Phillips	30	Signed	2 years	June 2017	
36	MF	(England)	Alex Purver	30	Signed	1 year	June 2016	
	DF	(England)	Jake Skelton	30	Signed	1 year	June 2016	
28	FW	(England)	Lewis Walters	31	Signed	1 year	June 2016	
	MF	(England)	Tom Lyman	29	Signed	1 year	June 2016	
	FW	(Republic of Ireland)	Frank Mulhern	29	Signed	1 year	June 2016	
	GK	(England)	Bailey Peacock-Farrell	30	Signed	1 year	June 2016	
8	MF	(England)	Luke Murphy	37	Signed	4 years	June 2019	
28	DF	(Switzerland)	Gaetano Berardi	38	Signed	3 years	June 2018	
31	DF	(England)	Lewie Coyle	31	Signed	2 years	June 2017	
2	DF	(England)	Sam Byram	33	Rejected	2 years	June 2017	
37	MF	(Guinea-Bissau)	Ronaldo Vieira	28	Signed	2 years	June 2018	
11	FW	(Senegal)	Souleymane Doukara	34	Signed	3 years	June 2018	

== Pre-season ==
Leeds United confirmed pre-season fixtures against Athletic Bilbao and Hoffenheim, the game originally scheduled against Athletic Bilbao was changed to Eintracht Frankfurt due to the Spanish side's commitments in the Europa League qualifiers.

Leeds United later confirmed games against Harrogate Town, York City and Everton.

10 July 2015	Harrogate Town	1–1	Leeds United	Harrogate
19:30 BST	Nyoni 32'	Report	Morison 49'	Stadium: CNG Stadium; Attendance: 3,102; Referee: Jason Whiteley

15 July 2015	Tadcaster Albion	0–3	Leeds United XI	Tadcaster
19:00 BST		Report	Antenucci 5'; Sharp 47'; Doukara (?)	Stadium: i2i Stadium; Attendance: 1,011

15 July 2015	York City	1–1	Leeds United	York
19:10 BST	McCoy 81'	Report	Byram 35'	Stadium: Bootham Crescent; Attendance: 4,348

21 July 2015	Leeds United	1–2	Eintracht Frankfurt	Eugendorf, Austria
17:15 BST	Morison 27'	Report	Flum 59'; Reinartz 74'	Stadium: Sportzentrum Eugendorf; Referee: Wolfram Aufschnaiter

25 July 2015	Leeds United	1–2	TSG Hoffenheim	Lillestrøm, Norway
15:00 BST	Adeyemi 25'; Phillips (yellow card) 45'; Bamba (yellow card) 62'; Cooper (yellow card) 71'	Report	Uth 2'; Zuber 67'; Schär (yellow card) 38'; Rudy (yellow card) 90'	Stadium: Åråsen Stadion; Attendance: 2,824; Referee: Trond Ivar Døvle

1 August 2015	Leeds United	2–0	Everton	Leeds
15:00 BST	Mowatt 57'; Wood 80'; Byram (yellow card) 44'	Report		Stadium: Elland Road; Attendance: 17,057; Referee: Martin Atkinson

13 November 2015	Wycombe Wanderers	0–2	Leeds United	High Wycombe
19:45 GMT		Report	Erwin 30'; Byram 51'	Stadium: Adams Park; Attendance: 2,216; Referee: Andy Woolmer

== Competitions ==
=== Overall summary ===
Competition	Started round	Current position / round	Final position / round	First match	Last match
2015–16 Championship	—	—	13th	8 August 2015	7 May 2016
League Cup	First round	—	First round	13 August 2015	13 August 2015
FA Cup	Third round	—	Fifth round	9 January 2016	20 February 2016

Updated to match played 7 May 2016
Source: Competitions

=== Championship ===
==== League table ====
Pos	Team	Pld	W	D	L	GF	GA	GD	Pts
11	Preston North End	46	15	17	14	45	45	0	62
12	Queens Park Rangers	46	14	18	14	54	54	0	60
13	Leeds United	46	14	17	15	50	58	−8	59
14	Wolverhampton Wanderers	46	14	16	16	53	58	−5	58
15	Blackburn Rovers	46	13	16	17	46	46	0	55

Source: BBC Sport
Rules for classification: 1) Points; 2) Goal difference; 3) Number of goals scored

==== Results summary ====
Overall								Home						Away					
Pld	W	D	L	GF	GA	GD	Pts	W	D	L	GF	GA	GD	W	D	L	GF	GA	GD
46	14	17	15	50	57	−7	59	7	8	8	23	28	−5	7	9	7	27	29	−2

Last updated: 7 May 2016.
Source: The Football League

==== Results by matchday ====
Matchday	1	2	3	4	5	6	7	8	9	10	11	12	13	14	15	16	17	18	19	20	21	22	23	24	25	26	27	28	29	30	31	32	33	34	35	36	37	38	39	40	41	42	43	44	45	46
Ground	H	A	A	H	A	H	H	A	A	H	H	A	A	H	H	A	H	A	H	A	A	H	A	H	H	A	A	H	A	H	H	H	A	H	A	A	H	A	H	A	A	H	H	A	H	A
Result	D	D	D	D	W	D	L	W	L	L	L	D	D	L	W	W	L	L	W	D	W	W	D	D	D	L	L	W	D	L	D	D	L	W	W	W	L	L	D	L	W	W	W	D	L	D
Position	13	16	15	15	10	11	14	10	14	16	18	18	17	18	17	14	16	17	17	18	14	13	12	12	13	15	17	16	14	16	16	17	17	16	15	12	13	14	15	15	15	12	11	12	12	13

Updated to match(es) played on 7 May 2016. Source: Matches
A = Away; H = Home; W = Win; D = Draw; L = Loss

==== Matches ====
On 17 June, the Championship fixtures were announced.

8 August 2015 1	Leeds United	1–1	Burnley	Leeds
12:30 BST	Antenucci 83'; Sol Bamba (yellow card) 10'	Report	Vokes 86'; Arfield (yellow card) 56'; Kightly (yellow card) 81'	Stadium: Elland Road; Attendance: 27,672; Referee: Kevin Friend

16 August 2015 2	Reading	0–0	Leeds United	Reading
15:00 BST	Norwood (yellow card) 82'	Report	Bamba (yellow card) 2'; Murphy (yellow card) 75'; Adeyemi (yellow card) 90+2'	Stadium: Madejski Stadium; Attendance: 21,581 (4,131 away); Referee: Chris Kavanagh

19 August 2015 3	Bristol City	2–2	Leeds United	Bristol
19:45 BST	Agard 89'; Flint 90+5'; Fredericks (yellow card) 3'; Hamer (yellow card) 38'	Report	Antenucci 39' (pen.); Wood 52' (yellow card) 90+2'; Adeyemi (yellow card) 36'; Bamba (yellow card) 53'; Byram (yellow card) 70'; Wootton (yellow card) 90'	Stadium: Ashton Gate; Attendance: 14,712 (1,307 away); Referee: Andy Davies

22 August 2015 4	Leeds United	1–1	Sheffield Wednesday	Leeds
12:30 BST	Wood 61'; Phillips (yellow card) 61'; Berardi (yellow card) 22'	Report	Matias 37'; Lees (yellow card) 43'; Sougou (yellow card) 52'; Hutchinson (yellow card) 73'; Hélan (yellow card) 81'	Stadium: Elland Road; Attendance: 22,597; Referee: Mike Jones

29 August 2015 5	Derby County	1–2	Leeds United	Derby
12:05 BST	Martin 48'; Hendrick (yellow card) 72'	Report	Adeyemi 43'; Wood 88'	Stadium: Pride Park Stadium; Attendance: 29,386 (2,335 away); Referee: Darren Bond

12 September 2015 6	Leeds United	1–1	Brentford	Leeds
15:00 BST	Antenucci 76' (yellow card) 77'; Dallas (yellow card) 45+2'	Report	Djuricin 29'; Colin (yellow card) 5'; Diagouraga (yellow card) 82'; Judge (yellow card) 85'	Stadium: Elland Road; Attendance: 25,126; Referee: Nigel Miller

15 September 2015 7	Leeds United	0–1	Ipswich Town	Leeds
19:45 BST	Bamba (yellow card) 7'; Cook (yellow card) 71'; Byram (yellow card) 85'	Report	Smith 32'; Parr (yellow card) 77'	Stadium: Elland Road; Attendance: 21,312; Referee: James Adcock

19 September 2015 8	Milton Keynes Dons	1–2	Leeds United	Milton Keynes
15:00 BST	Church 74'; Lewington (yellow card) 75'; Carruthers (red card) 78'		Wood 31' (pen.); Taylor 43'; Cooper (yellow card) 45+1'; Wootton (yellow card) 90+1'	Stadium: Stadium mk Attendance: 19,284 (6,297 away); Referee: David Webb

27 September 2015 9	Middlesbrough	3–0	Leeds United	Middlesbrough
13:15 BST	Nugent 3'; Bellusci 32' (o.g.); Fabbrini 81'; Stuani (yellow card) 31'; Fabbrini (yellow card) 73'; Ayala (yellow card) 78'	Report		Stadium: Riverside Stadium; Attendance: 27,694 (2,652 away); Referee: Neil Swarbrick

3 October 2015 10	Leeds United	0–2	Birmingham City	Leeds
15:00 BST	Cooper (yellow card) 19'; Cook (yellow card) 65'; Antenucci (yellow card) 90+4'	Report	Gray 31'; Maghoma 90'; Davis (yellow card) 62'	Stadium: Elland Road; Attendance: 24,601 (898 away); Referee: Paul Tierney

17 October 2015 11	Leeds United	1–2	Brighton & Hove Albion	Leeds
15:00 BST	Cooper 22'	Report	March 14'; Zamora 89'; Bruno (yellow card) 80'; Bong (yellow card) 90+3'	Stadium: Elland Road; Attendance: 22,736; Referee: Darren Deadman

21 October 2015 12	Fulham	1–1	Leeds United	Fulham
19:45 BST	Dembélé 23' (yellow card) 40'; O'Hara (yellow card) 45'; Burn (yellow card) 90+2'; Garbutt (yellow card) 90+3'	Report	Wood 64' (pen.); Cook (yellow card) 90+3'	Stadium: Craven Cottage; Attendance: 19,969 (3,789 away); Referee: Keith Hill

24 October 2015 13	Bolton Wanderers	1–1	Leeds United	Horwich
15:00 BST	Ameobi 32'; Gouano (red card) 71'	Report	Antenucci 71' (pen.); Byram (yellow card) 38'	Stadium: Macron Stadium; Attendance: 18,178 (4,419 away); Referee: Simon Hooper

29 October 2015 14	Leeds United	0–2	Blackburn Rovers	Leeds
19:45 GMT	Bamba (yellow card) 38'	Report	Conway 1' (yellow card) 90+4'; Rhodes 6'; Evans (yellow card) 90+2'	Stadium: Elland Road; Attendance: 19,666; Referee: Tim Robinson

3 November 2015 15	Leeds United	1–0	Cardiff City	Leeds
19:45 GMT	Mowatt 63'; Bellusci (yellow card) 67'	Report	Whittingham (yellow card) 20'	Stadium: Elland Road; Attendance: 17,914; Referee: Carl Boyeson

7 November 2015 16	Huddersfield Town	0–3	Leeds United	Huddersfield
12:30 GMT	Cranie (yellow card) 25'	Report	Antenucci 45+4' (yellow card) 45+4'; Wood 45+5'; Mowatt 54'; Wootton (yellow card) 22'	Stadium: John Smith's Stadium; Attendance: 17,118 (3,831 away); Referee: Graham Scott

21 November 2015 17	Leeds United	0–1	Rotherham United	Leeds
15:00 GMT	Antenucci (yellow card) 31'; Murphy (yellow card) 63'; Berardi (red card) 74'; Bellusci (yellow card) 84'	Report	Joe Newell 54' (yellow card) 79'; Mattock (yellow card) 22'; Kirk Broadfoot (yellow card) 56'; Best (red card) 73'; D.Ward (yellow card) 84'	Stadium: Elland Road; Attendance: 25,802; Referee: Keith Stroud

28 November 2015 18	Queens Park Rangers	1–0	Leeds United	Shepherd's Bush
15:00 GMT	Austin 58'	Report	Bridcutt (yellow card) 7'; Wootton (yellow card) 36'; Cook (yellow card) 83'	Stadium: Loftus Road; Attendance: 18,031 (3,220 away); Referee: Peter Bankes

5 December 2015 19	Leeds United	2–1	Hull City	Leeds
15:00 GMT	Wood 30'; Adeyemi 45' (yellow card) 90+2'; Cook (yellow card) 54'; Silvestri (yellow card) 90+2'	Report	Elmohamady 51'	Stadium: Elland Road; Attendance: 24,962; Referee: Chris Kavanagh

12 December 2015 20	Charlton Athletic	0–0	Leeds United	Charlton
15:00 GMT	Cousins (yellow card) 48'; Ghoochannejhad (yellow card) 52'; Ba (yellow card) 90+1'	Report	Wootton (yellow card) 2'; Mowatt (yellow card) 56'; Bridcutt (yellow card) 62'; Bellusci (yellow card) 72'; Cook (yellow card) 90+1'	Stadium: The Valley; Attendance: 15,867 (3,129 away); Referee: Andy Davies

17 December 2015 21	Wolverhampton Wanderers	2–3	Leeds United	Wolverhampton
19:45 GMT	Afobe 10'; Byrne 81'	Report	Byram 44', 60'; Dallas 51'; Bellusci (yellow card) 56'	Stadium: Molineux Stadium; Attendance: 19,592 (1,693 away); Referee: Stuart Attwell

20 December 2015 22	Leeds United	1–0	Preston North End	Leeds
15:00 GMT	Browne 46' (o.g.); Byram (yellow card) 77'	Report	Pickford (red card) 31'; Gallagher (yellow card) 62'; Cunningham (yellow card) 65'; Clarke (yellow card) 78'; Reach (yellow card) 80'; Kilkenny (yellow card) 88'	Stadium: Elland Road; Attendance: 22,641; Referee: Gavin Ward

27 December 2015 23	Nottingham Forest	1–1	Leeds United	Nottingham
16:30 GMT	Oliveira 17'; Mendes (yellow card) 57'; Lansbury (yellow card) 71'; Osborn (yellow card) 81'	Report	Byram (yellow card) 15', (goal) 80'; Bellusci (yellow card) 71'	Stadium: City Ground; Attendance: 27,551 (1,890 away); Referee: James Linington

29 December 2015 24	Leeds United	2–2	Derby County	Leeds
19:45 GMT	Bamba 42'; Wood 71'; Byram (yellow card) 28'; Bridcutt (yellow card) 30'; Murphy (yellow card) 33'	Report	Hendrick 13' (yellow card) 42'; Ince 78'; Christie (yellow card) 57'	Stadium: Elland Road; Attendance: 23,027; Referee: Mark Heywood

2 January 2016 25	Leeds United	1–1	Milton Keynes Dons	Leeds
15:00 GMT	Antony Kay 87' (o.g.); Bamba (yellow card) 28'; Byram (yellow card) 60'	Report	Hall 30' (yellow card) 63'; Murphy (yellow card) 24'; Carruthers (yellow card) 44'; McFadzean (yellow card) 55'; Kay (yellow card) 89'	Stadium: Elland Road; Attendance: 24,356; Referee: Jeremy Simpson

12 January 2016 26	Ipswich Town	2–1	Leeds United	Ipswich
19:45 GMT	Chambers 50' (yellow card) 81'; Pitman 90+2'; Douglas (yellow card) 58'	Report	Doukara 1'; Phillips (yellow card) 83'	Stadium: Portman Road; Attendance: 19,146 (1,259 away); Referee: Fred Graham

16 January 2016 27	Sheffield Wednesday	2–0	Leeds United	Sheffield
12:30 GMT	Hooper 47', 50'; Hutchinson (yellow card) 34'; Pudil (yellow card) 74'	Report	Bellusci (yellow card) 37'; Cook (yellow card) 55'	Stadium: Hillsborough Stadium; Attendance: 23,909 (4,401 away); Referee: Anthony Taylor

23 January 2016 28	Leeds United	1–0	Bristol City	Leeds
15:00 GMT	Doukara 59'; Taylor (yellow card) 17'; Bellusci (yellow card) 41'; Antenucci (yellow card) 90'; Adeyemi (yellow card) 90+4'	Report	Baker (yellow card) 23'; Kodjia (yellow card) 26'	Stadium: Elland Road; Attendance: 20,441; Referee: Charles Breakspear

26 January 2016 29	Brentford	1–1	Leeds United	Brentford
19:45 GMT	Saunders 27'; Djuricin (yellow card) 81'	Report	Carayol 84' (yellow card) 79'; Cooper (yellow card) 34'; Bellusci (yellow card) 79'; Bridcutt (yellow card) 79'	Stadium: Griffin Park; Attendance: 10,051 (1,632 away); Referee: Iain Williamson

6 February 2016 30	Leeds United	0–1	Nottingham Forest	Leeds
15:00 GMT	Bridcutt (yellow card) 87'	Report	Oliveira 60'	Stadium: Elland Road; Attendance: 24,079; Referee: Scott Duncan

15 February 2016 31	Leeds United	0–0	Middlesbrough	Leeds
19:45 GMT	Diagouraga (yellow card) 41'; Bellusci (yellow card) 82'	Report	Clayton (yellow card) 25'; Gibson (red card) 89'	Stadium: Elland Road; Attendance: 20,424; Referee: Craig Pawson

23 February 2016 32	Leeds United	1–1	Fulham	Leeds
19:45 GMT	Cook 38' (yellow card) 90+3'; Bamba (yellow card) 68'	Report	Cairney 17'; Amorebieta (red card) 90+4'; Fredericks (yellow card) 84'	Stadium: Elland Road; Attendance: 17,103; Referee: Kevin Wright

29 February 2016 33	Brighton & Hove Albion	4–0	Leeds United	Brighton and Hove
19:45 GMT	Hemed 18', 28' (pen.); Cooper 22' (o.g.); Dunk 38'; Rosenior (yellow card) 7'; Baldock (yellow card) 34'; Goldson (yellow card) 60'	Report	Mowatt (yellow card) 33'; Coyle (yellow card) 57'; Cooper (yellow card) 68'; Taylor (yellow card) 90+3'	Stadium: Falmer Stadium; Attendance: 25,150 (1,522 away); Referee: Peter Bankes

5 March 2016 34	Leeds United	2–1	Bolton Wanderers	Leeds
15:00 GMT	Antenucci 39', 62'; Berardi (yellow card) 30'	Report	Woolery 74'	Stadium: Elland Road; Attendance: 21,070; Referee: Tony Harrington

8 March 2016 35	Cardiff City	0–2	Leeds United	Cardiff, Wales
19:45 GMT	Connolly (yellow card) 10'; Fábio (red card) 64'	Report	Doukara 37'; Antenucci 90+4'; Bridcutt (yellow card) 56'; Mowatt (yellow card) 62'; Berardi (yellow card) 65'; Dallas (yellow card) 90+1'	Stadium: Cardiff City Stadium; Attendance: 15,273 (1,268 away); Referee: Darren Deadman

12 March 2016 36	Blackburn Rovers	1–2	Leeds United	Blackburn
12:30 GMT	Jackson 89'; Hanley (yellow card) 80'	Report	Bamba 34'; Antenucci 69' (yellow card) 70'; Berardi (yellow card) 80'; Bellusci (yellow card) 81'; Cook (yellow card) 90+2'	Stadium: Ewood Park; Attendance: 16,071 (3,344 away); Referee: Keith Stroud

19 March 2016 37	Leeds United	1–4	Huddersfield Town	Leeds
15:00 GMT	Dallas 22' (yellow card) 22'; Murphy (yellow card) 20'; Bellusci (yellow card) 62'; Taylor (yellow card) 67'; Mowatt (yellow card) 90+1'; Cook (yellow card) 90+3'	Report	Hudson 41'; Bunn 69'; Matmour 73'; Wells (penalty missed) 11' 77'; Billing (yellow card) 16'; Lolley (yellow card) 18'	Stadium: Elland Road; Attendance: 29,311; Referee: Graham Scott

2 April 2016 38	Rotherham United	2–1	Leeds United	Rotherham
15:00 BST	Frecklington 27'; Halford 90' (pen.); Best (yellow card) 44'; Derbyshire (red card) 61'	Report	Murphy 79'; Bridcutt (yellow card) 57'; Bellusci (yellow card) 68'; Silvestri (red card) 89'	Stadium: New York Stadium; Attendance: 11,418 (2,311 away); Referee: Kevin Friend

5 April 2016 39	Leeds United	1–1	Queens Park Rangers	Leeds
19:45 BST	Wood 70'	Report	Chery 87' (pen.)	Stadium: Elland Road; Attendance: 17,388; Referee: James Adcock

9 April 2016 40	Burnley	1–0	Leeds United	Burnley
12:30 BST	Arfield 1'; Barton (yellow card) 58'	Report	Murphy (yellow card) 67'	Stadium: Turf Moor; Attendance: 18,229 (2,188 away); Referee: Lee Mason

12 April 2016 41	Birmingham City	1–2	Leeds United	Birmingham
19:45 BST	Donaldson 53'; Lafferty (yellow card) 89'	Report	Dallas 11', 50'; Berardi (yellow card) 32'; Bamba (yellow card) 90+1'; Mowatt (red card) 90+4'	Stadium: St Andrew's; Attendance: 16,081 (1,365 away); Referee: Chris Kavanagh

16 April 2016 42	Leeds United	3–2	Reading	Leeds
15:00 BST	Diagouraga 48'; Wood 69', 85'; Antenucci (yellow card) 65'; Cooper (yellow card) 89'	Report	Hector 39'; Rakels 81'; Evans (yellow card) 35'; McCleary (yellow card) 65'; Norwood (yellow card) 79'	Stadium: Elland Road; Attendance: 20,881; Referee: Jeremy Simpson

19 April 2016 43	Leeds United	2–1	Wolverhampton Wanderers	Leeds
19:45 BST	Bamba 60'; Diagouraga 64'	Report	Saville 77'; Iorfa (yellow card) 31'	Stadium: Elland Road; Attendance: 17,694 (478 away); Referee: David Coote

23 April 2016 44	Hull City	2–2	Leeds United	Kingston upon Hull
15:00 BST	Hernández 45+1'; Huddlestone 45+3'; Odubajo (yellow card) 65'; Livermore (yellow card) 72'; Maguire (yellow card) 85'	Report	Wood 15' (penalty missed) 54'; Dallas 88'; Bamba (yellow card) 30'; Cooper (yellow card) 79'	Stadium: KC Stadium; Attendance: 20,732 (2,356 away); Referee: Iain Williamson

30 April 2016 45	Leeds United	1–2	Charlton Athletic	Leeds
15:00 BST	Bamba 71'	Report	Guðmundsson 39'; Lookman 49'; Diarra (yellow card) 17'; Kashi (yellow card) 71'	Stadium: Elland Road; Attendance: 25,458; Referee: Keith Hill

7 May 2016 46	Preston North End	1–1	Leeds United	Preston
12:30 BST	Hugill 90+1'	Report	Wood 78' (pen.)	Stadium: Deepdale; Attendance: 18,473 (5,464 away); Referee: Brendan Malone

=== FA Cup ===
Leeds United were drawn at home to Rotherham United in the third round, away to Bolton Wanderers in the fourth round and away to Watford in the fifth round.

9 January 2016 Third round	Leeds United	2–0	Rotherham United	Leeds
15:00 GMT	Carayol 45'; Doukara 90'	Report	Clarke-Harris (yellow card) 83'	Stadium: Elland Road; Attendance: 16,039; Referee: Andy Woolmer

30 January 2016 Fourth round	Bolton Wanderers	1–2	Leeds United	Horwich
15:00 GMT	Pratley 80'; Vela (yellow card) 82'	Report	Doukara 8'; Diagouraga 39' (yellow card) 50'	Stadium: Macron Stadium; Attendance: 17,336; Referee: Andre Marriner

20 February 2016 Fifth round	Watford	1–0	Leeds United	Watford
15:00 GMT	Wootton 53' (o.g.); Paredes (yellow card) 32'; Cathcart (yellow card) 67'	Report	Bellusci (yellow card) 24'; Bridcutt (yellow card) 52'	Stadium: Vicarage Road; Attendance: 18,336; Referee: Michael Oliver

=== League Cup ===
Leeds United were drawn away to Doncaster Rovers in the first round.

13 August 2015 First round	Doncaster Rovers	1–1 (a.e.t.) (4–2 p)	Leeds United	Doncaster
19:45 BST	Williams 31' (pen.)	Report	Cook 14' (red card) 37'	Stadium: Keepmoat Stadium; Attendance: 8,361; Referee: Keith Hill
	Penalties
	Tyson (penalty scored); Williams (penalty scored); Forrester (penalty scored); Wellens (penalty scored)		(penalty scored) Antenucci; (penalty scored) Murphy; (penalty missed) Byram; (penalty missed) Wood

== Squad statistics ==
=== Appearances and goals ===
As of 7 May 2016

No.	Pos	Nat	Player	Total		Championship		FA Cup		League Cup	
No.	Pos	Nat	Player	Apps	Goals	Apps	Goals	Apps	Goals	Apps	Goals
1	GK	(Italy) ITA	Marco Silvestri	48	0	45+0	0	3+0	0	0+0	0
3	DF	(Ivory Coast) CIV	Sol Bamba	33	4	28+2	4	2+1	0	0+0	0
4	DF	(England) ENG	Scott Wootton	26	0	21+2	0	2+0	0	1+0	0
5	DF	(Italy) ITA	Giuseppe Bellusci	31	0	25+2	0	3+0	0	1+0	0
6	DF	(Scotland) SCO	Liam Cooper	41	1	39+0	1	1+0	0	1+0	0
7	FW	(Italy) ITA	Mirco Antenucci	43	9	21+18	9	3+0	0	1+0	0
8	MF	(England) ENG	Luke Murphy	38	1	25+11	1	1+0	0	0+1	0
9	FW	(New Zealand) NZL	Chris Wood	37	13	33+3	13	0+0	0	0+1	0
10	MF	(England) ENG	Alex Mowatt	36	2	22+12	2	0+1	0	1+0	0
11	FW	(Senegal) SEN	Souleymane Doukara	27	5	13+10	3	3+0	2	1+0	0
15	MF	(Northern Ireland) NIR	Stuart Dallas	49	5	38+7	5	2+1	0	1+0	0
16	MF	(France) FRA	Toumani Diagouraga	19	3	13+4	2	2+0	1	0+0	0
18	MF	(The Gambia) GAM	Mustapha Carayol (On loan from Middlesbrough)	14	2	6+6	1	1+1	1	0+0	0
19	FW	(Scotland) SCO	Lee Erwin	12	0	2+9	0	0+1	0	0+0	0
20	FW	(Democratic Republic of the Congo) COD	Jordan Botaka	14	0	3+10	0	0+1	0	0+0	0
21	DF	(England) ENG	Charlie Taylor	43	1	39+0	1	3+0	0	1+0	0
22	GK	(England) ENG	Ross Turnbull	1	0	0+0	0	0+0	0	1+0	0
23	MF	(England) ENG	Lewis Cook	47	2	41+2	1	2+1	0	1+0	1
24	MF	(England) ENG	Tom Adeyemi (On loan from Cardiff City)	24	2	17+6	2	0+1	0	0+0	0
26	MF	(Scotland) SCO	Liam Bridcutt (On loan from Sunderland)	27	0	23+1	0	3+0	0	0+0	0
27	MF	(England) ENG	Kalvin Phillips	10	0	3+7	0	0+0	0	0+0	0
28	DF	(Switzerland) SUI	Gaetano Berardi	29	0	25+3	0	0+0	0	1+0	0
29	MF	(Denmark) DEN	Casper Sloth	0	0	0+0	0	0+0	0	0+0	0
31	DF	(England) ENG	Lewie Coyle	13	0	6+5	0	1+1	0	0+0	0
37	MF	(Guinea-Bissau) GBS	Ronaldo Vieira	1	0	0+1	0	0+0	0	0+0	0
41	GK	(Ireland) EIR	Eric Grimes	0	0	0+0	0	0+0	0	0+0	0
45	GK	(England) ENG	Bailey Peacock-Farrell	1	0	1+0	0	0+0	0	0+0	0
Players currently out on loan:
14	MF	(Italy) ITA	Tommaso Bianchi (On loan to Ascoli)	0	0	0+0	0	0+0	0	0+0	0
Players who have been available for selection this season, but have now permanently left the club:
2	DF	(England) ENG	Sam Byram (joined West Ham United)	24	3	16+6	3	1+0	0	0+1	0
25	MF	(England) ENG	Will Buckley (On loan from Sunderland)	4	0	1+3	0	0+0	0	0+0	0
30	GK	(United States) USA	Charlie Horton	0	0	0+0	0	0+0	0	0+0	0

Source: Sky Sports

=== Top scorers ===
Place	Position	Nationality	Number	Name	Championship	FA Cup	League Cup	Total
1	FW	(New Zealand)	9	Chris Wood	13	0	0	13
2	FW	(Italy)	7	Mirco Antenucci	9	0	0	9
3	FW	(Senegal)	11	Souleymane Doukara	3	2	0	5
3	MF	(Northern Ireland)	15	Stuart Dallas	5	0	0	5
4	DF	(Ivory Coast)	3	Sol Bamba	4	0	0	4
5	DF	(England)	2	Sam Byram_{1}	3	0	0	3
5	MF	(France)	16	Toumani Diagouraga	2	1	0	3
6	MF	(England)	24	Tom Adeyemi	2	0	0	2
6	MF	(The Gambia)	18	Mustapha Carayol	1	1	0	2
6	MF	(England)	23	Lewis Cook	1	0	1	2
6	Own goal				2	0	0	2
6	MF	(England)	10	Alex Mowatt	2	0	0	2
7	DF	(Scotland)	6	Liam Cooper	1	0	0	1
7	MF	(England)	8	Luke Murphy	1	0	0	1
7	DF	(England)	21	Charlie Taylor	1	0	0	1
TOTALS					50	4	1	55

Byram joined West Ham United on 20 January 2016.

=== Disciplinary record ===
Last Updated: 23 April 2016

Nation	Name	Yellow card	Red card
(England)	Lewis Cook	10	1
(Switzerland)	Gaetano Berardi	5	1
(England)	Alex Mowatt	4	1
(Italy)	Marco Silvestri	1	1
(Italy)	Giuseppe Bellusci	13	0
(Ivory Coast)	Sol Bamba	9	0
(Scotland)	Liam Bridcutt	8	0
(France)	Toumani Diagouraga	8^{3}	0
(Italy)	Mirco Antenucci	7	0
(England)	Sam Byram_{1}	7	0
(Scotland)	Liam Cooper	6	0
(England)	Luke Murphy	5	0
(England)	Scott Wootton	5	0
(England)	Tom Adeyemi	4	0
(The Gambia)	Mustapha Carayol	3_{2}	0
(Northern Ireland)	Stuart Dallas	3	0
(England)	Charlie Taylor	3	0
(England)	Kalvin Phillips	2	0
(England)	Lewie Coyle	1	0
(New Zealand)	Chris Wood	1	0

_{1}Byram joined West Ham United on 20 January 2016.
_{2}Carayol picked up two yellows during his previous loan spell at Huddersfield Town, before joining Leeds.
_{3}Diagouraga picked up six yellows at Brentford, before joining Leeds.

==== Suspensions served ====
As of 12 April 2016

Date	Matches Missed	Player	Reason	Opponents Missed
13 August 2015	3	Lewis Cook	(red card) vs Doncaster (LC)	Reading (A), Bristol City (A), Sheffield Wednesday (H)
29 October 2015	1	Sol Bamba	(yellow card) (yellow card) (yellow card) (yellow card) (yellow card) vs Blackburn (H)	Cardiff (H)
21 November 2015	2	Gaetano Berardi	(red card) vs Rotherham (H)	QPR (A), Hull (H)
20 February 2016	2	Giuseppe Bellusci	(yellow card) (yellow card) (yellow card) (yellow card) (yellow card) (yellow card) (yellow card) (yellow card) (yellow card) (yellow card) vs Watford (FA)	Fulham (H), Brighton (A)
31 March 2016	8	Souleymane Doukara	Violent conduct vs Fulham (H)	Rotherham (A), QPR (H), Burnley (A), Birmingham (A), Reading (H), Wolves (H), Hull (A), Charlton (H)
2 April 2016	1	Marco Silvestri	(red card) vs Rotherham (A)	QPR (H)
12 April 2016	3	Alex Mowatt	(red card) vs Birmingham (A)	Reading (H), Wolves (H), Hull (A)

=== Captains ===
No.	P	Name	Country	No. games	Notes
3	DF	Sol Bamba	(Ivory Coast) (France)	30	Club Captain
6	DF	Liam Cooper	(Scotland) (England)	20	

Last updated: 7 May 2016
Source: Competitive match reports.
Competitive matches only
Matches started as captain only
Country: FIFA nationality; No.: Squad number; P: Position; Name: Player name; No. Games: Number of games started as captain.

== Awards ==
=== Internal Awards ===
==== Official Player of the Year Awards ====
The results of the 2015–16 Leeds United F.C. Player of the Year Awards were announced at a dinner on 30 April 2016 at Elland Road.

- Fans' Player of the Year: Charlie Taylor
- Young Player of the Year: Lewis Cook
- Players' Player of the Year: Stuart Dallas
- Goal of the Season: Lewis Cook (vs Fulham, 23 February 2016)
