= Souleymane Doukara =

Footballer (born 1991)

Personal information
- Full name: Souleymane Doukara
- Date of birth: 29 September 1991 (age 35)
- Place of birth: Meudon, France
- Height: 1.86 m (6 ft 1 in)
- Positions: Striker; winger

Youth career
- SCM Châtillon
- CA Paris
- Paris Université Club

Senior career*
Years	Team	Apps	(Gls)
2008–2011	Rovigo	76	(11)
2011–2012	Vibonese	37	(13)
2012–2014	Catania	13	(0)
2013–2014	→ Juve Stabia (loan)	21	(6)
2014–2017	Leeds United	82	(14)
2017–2018	Osmanlıspor	16	(2)
2018–2019	Antalyaspor	40	(16)
2019–2021	Ettifaq	56	(8)
2021–2022	Giresunspor	19	(3)
2022–2023	Levadiakos	0	(0)
2023	Gençlerbirliği	13	(1)
2023–2024	Mağusa Türk Gücü	29	(21)
2024–2025	Gönyeli	21	(15)
2025–2026	Aubagne	5	(0)

International career^{‡}
2021–	Mauritania	9	(0)
- * Club domestic league appearances and goals as of 12 December 2025 ‡ National team caps and goals as of 20 January 2024 (UTC)

Souleymane Doukara (born 29 September 1991) is a professional footballer who plays as a striker or a winger for the Mauritania national team. He is nicknamed Dudu or The Duke. Born in France, he plays for the Mauritania national team.

== Club career ==
=== Early career ===
Doukara was born in Meudon, Hauts-de-Seine. He started his professional career during the 2008–09 season, playing for Rovigo Calcio in the Lega Pro Seconda Divisione. Making his first team debut at the age of 16 he played seven games that season, without scoring goals. Doukara was scouted by AC Milan who had an option to sign him from Rovigo, he even played for their youth team on a trial spell during a youth tournament in Milan, but the club decided against signing him. His club participated in the 2009–10 Serie D season and Doukara had his first chance to play as a regular starter; at the end of the championship he had made 36 appearances. His form earned him a trial spell at Grasshopper Club Zürich in the Swiss Super League but he was unable to earn a contract.

Prior to the 2011–12 Lega Pro season, Doukara was transferred to Seconda Divisione club Vibonese, in which he played 37 out of 42 league matches, scoring 13 goals.

=== Catania ===
After impressing scouts in the Italian fourth tier, Doukara officially signed with Serie A outfit, Catania. He made his Serie A debut on 16 September 2012, when he came on as a substitute for Alejandro Gómez against Fiorentina in a 2–0 loss after goals from Luca Toni and Stevan Jovetić. Doukara primarily served as a back-up to Argentine international's Gonzalo Bergessio and Maxi López, though he made 12 Serie A appearances in his maiden top flight season. Additionally, he made two Coppa Italia appearances that season in Catania's quarter-final run. Doukara failed to score for the Sicilian outfit in his debut season at the club.

On 1 September 2013, Doukara played in the 3–0 defeat of Catania by Serie A side Internazionale.

==== Loan to Juve Stabia ====
On 2 September, the last day of the transfer window, Doukara joined Serie B side Juve Stabia on loan. Subsequently, he scored six goals in 20 games during the 2013–14 season. However this wasn't enough to keep Juve Stabia in the division as they were relegated, finishing bottom.

=== Leeds United ===
==== 2014–15 ====
On 11 July 2014, it was confirmed by Leeds United owner Massimo Cellino that the club would sign him on season-long loan with the option for a permanent deal. On 12 July, Doukara's signing to Leeds was confirmed on the club's official Twitter page. On 1 August, Doukara was assigned the Leeds number 29 shirt for the 2014–15 season. Doukara made his debut for Leeds on 9 August against Millwall.

Doukara's first goal for Leeds United came on 12 August 2014, in a League Cup match against Accrington Stanley with fellow newcomer Gaetano Berardi getting the assist. He scored his second less than twenty minutes later to make it 2–0 to the home side.

However, on 16 August, Doukara tore his ankle ligaments in the 1–0 victory over Middlesbrough. The injury would rule him out for 4–5 weeks.

On 1 September 2014, Doukara's loan deal was made permanent, signing a three-year deal at the club. On 16 September 2014 he scored his first league goal for Leeds and his third in all competitions against Bournemouth in a 3–1 win. On 20 September, Doukara scored his fourth goal of the season and his first league goal at Elland Road in a 3–0 win over local rivals Huddersfield Town. Doukara scored his 5th goal of the season in a 1–1 draw against Norwich City, with teammate Adryan providing an assist. The same game saw him pick up a suspension for receiving his 5th yellow card of the season. Doukara returned from suspension and scored his 6th goal of the season against Blackpool in a 3–1 win on 8 November.

On 18 April 2015, Doukara was one of six Massimo Cellino signings (including Mirco Antenucci, Giuseppe Bellusci, Marco Silvestri, Dario Del Fabro and Edgar Çani) who controversially pulled out of the squad with an 'injury' the day before a 2–1 loss against Charlton Athletic.

On 2 May 2015, Doukara's strike against Blackpool was nominated for Leeds United's goal of the season at the end of the 2014–15 season awards ceremony, but lost out to eventual winner Rudy Austin's goal against Watford.

==== 2015–16 ====
On 31 July 2015, Doukara was given the number 11 shirt for the upcoming 2015–16 season. He scored against Rotherham United on 9 January 2016 in a 2–0 win to help Leeds advance to the fourth round of the FA Cup. He scored his fourth goal in five games in a 2–1 victory over Bolton Wanderers in the FA Cup on 30 January. On 31 March 2016, Doukara was banned for eight matches after biting Fernando Amorebieta during Leeds' home game with Fulham on 23 February 2016.

After being banned for eight matches, Doukara returned to the Leeds squad upon the expiry of his ban in the final game of the season in Leeds' 1–1 draw against Preston North End.

==== 2016–17 ====
Doukara made his first start of the season for Leeds on 23 August 2016, starting in Leeds' League Cup fixture against Luton Town. He came on as a substitute on 29 October 2016 against Burton Albion, making an immediate impact by winning the penalty scored by teammate Chris Wood which was followed by Doukara's first goal of the season to seal the game at 2–0 deep into stoppage time.

After reclaiming his place in the squad, becoming a regular on the Left Wing for Leeds, On 26 November, Doukara scored the winner for Leeds against Rotherham United in a 2–1 victory. On 9 December in a 2–0 defeat against Brighton & Hove Albion, Doukara was converted to an unfamiliar Central Midfield role due to injuries to Liam Bridcutt, Eunan O'Kane and the red card of Kalvin Phillips in the same game. He continued in the Central Midfield role, starting against Reading F.C. with Kalvin Phillips suspended, Doukara scored his third goal of the season in the same game in a 2–0 victory.

He scored his fourth of the season in a 4–1 victory against Preston North End on 26 December 2016.

On 25 January 2017, Doukara scored a powerful long range volley in a 2–0 win over Nottingham Forest with his first touch of the ball after coming on a substitute. Many drew comparisons of the goal to that of Leeds legend Tony Yeboah's famous volley against Liverpool.

On 30 April 2017, Doukara's volley against Nottingham Forest was named Goal Of The Season at Leeds United's end of season awards.

==== 2017–18 ====
After not featuring during the 2017–18 season under new Head Coach Thomas Christiansen, Doukara was set to start in Leeds' 5–1 EFL Cup victory against Newport County on 22 August, however Christiansen revealed that Doukara was in talks with a club so was dropped out of the lineup. On 23 August his contract with Leeds United was terminated by mutual consent.

=== Osmanlıspor ===
On the same day following his release from Leeds, he joined Turkish Süper Lig side Osmanlıspor on a two-year deal.

=== Antalyaspor ===
He joined fellow Turkish Süper Lig side Antalyaspor on 31 January 2018 for an undisclosed fee from Osmanlıspor. He scored 6 goals in his first 13 games for the club.

=== Ettifaq ===
On 22 August 2019, Al-Ettifaq has signed Doukara for one seasons from Antalyaspor.

=== Giresunspor ===
On 31 March 2022, Turkish club Giresunspor unilaterally terminated their contract with Doukara for "the displays of joy and behavior contrary to the loyalty obligation" during a game against his earlier club Antalyaspor on 20 March.

=== Gençlerbirliği ===
In January 2023, Doukara returned to Turkey to join Gençlerbirliği on an eighteen-month contract, following a spell in Greece with Levadiakos.

== International career ==
Doukara was born in France and is of Senegalese and Mauritanian descent. On 5 April 2014, he declared that he wanted to play for Senegal. He was called up to represent the Mauritania national team for the 2021 Africa Cup of Nations. He debuted with the Mauritania national team in a 0–0 friendly tie with Burkina Faso on 30 December 2021.

== Style of play ==
Doukara plays as a striker but he can also play as a winger. He revealed in a 2013 interview that his favourite player was Nicolas Anelka due to his style of play.

== Career statistics ==
=== Club ===
As of 3 March 2025

Appearances and goals by club, season and competition
Club	Season	League			National Cup		League Cup		Other		Total	
Club	Season	Division	Apps	Goals	Apps	Goals	Apps	Goals	Apps	Goals	Apps	Goals
Rovigo	2008-09	Lega Pro 2	6	0	0	0	0	0	0	0	6	0
Rovigo	2009-10	Serie D	36	6	0	0	0	0	0	0	36	6
Rovigo	2010-11	Serie D	33	5	0	0	0	0	0	0	33	5
Rovigo	Total		75	11	0	0	0	0	0	0	75	11
Vibonese	2011-12	Lega Pro 2	41	14	0	0	0	0	0	0	41	14
Catania	2012–13	Serie A	12	0	2	0	—		0	0	14	0
Catania	2013–14	Serie A	1	0	0	0	—		0	0	1	0
Catania	Total		13	0	2	0	—		0	0	15	0
Juve Stabia	2013-14	Serie B	21	6	0	0	0	0	0	0	21	6
Leeds United	2014–15	Championship	25	5	1	0	1	2	0	0	27	7
Leeds United	2015–16	Championship	23	3	3	2	1	0	0	0	27	5
Leeds United	2016–17	Championship	34	6	2	0	3	0	0	0	39	6
Leeds United	Total		82	14	6	2	5	2	0	0	93	18
Ankaraspor	2017-18	Süper Lig	15	2	0	0	0	0	0	0	15	2
Antalyaspor	2017-18	Süper Lig	14	6	4	3	0	0	0	0	18	9
Antalyaspor	2018-19	Süper Lig	26	10	1	0	0	0	0	0	27	10
Antalyaspor	Total		40	16	5	3	0	0	0	0	45	19
Al-Ettifaq	2019-20	Saudi Pro League	29	6	1	0	0	0	0	0	30	6
Al-Ettifaq	2020-21	Saudi Pro League	27	2	1	0	0	0	0	0	28	2
Al-Ettifaq	Total		56	8	2	0	0	0	0	0	58	8
Giresunspor	2021-22	Süper Lig	19	3	0	0	0	0	0	0	19	3
Gençlerbirliği	2022-23	TFF First League	13	1	0	0	0	0	0	0	13	1
Mağusa Türk Gücü	2023-24	Birinci Lig	29	21	5	5	0	0	1	0	35	26
Gönyeli	2024-25	Birinci Lig	21	15	2	0	-		-		23	15
Career total			425	111	22	10	5	2	1	0	453	123
