= Gaetano Berardi =

Swiss footballer (born 1988)

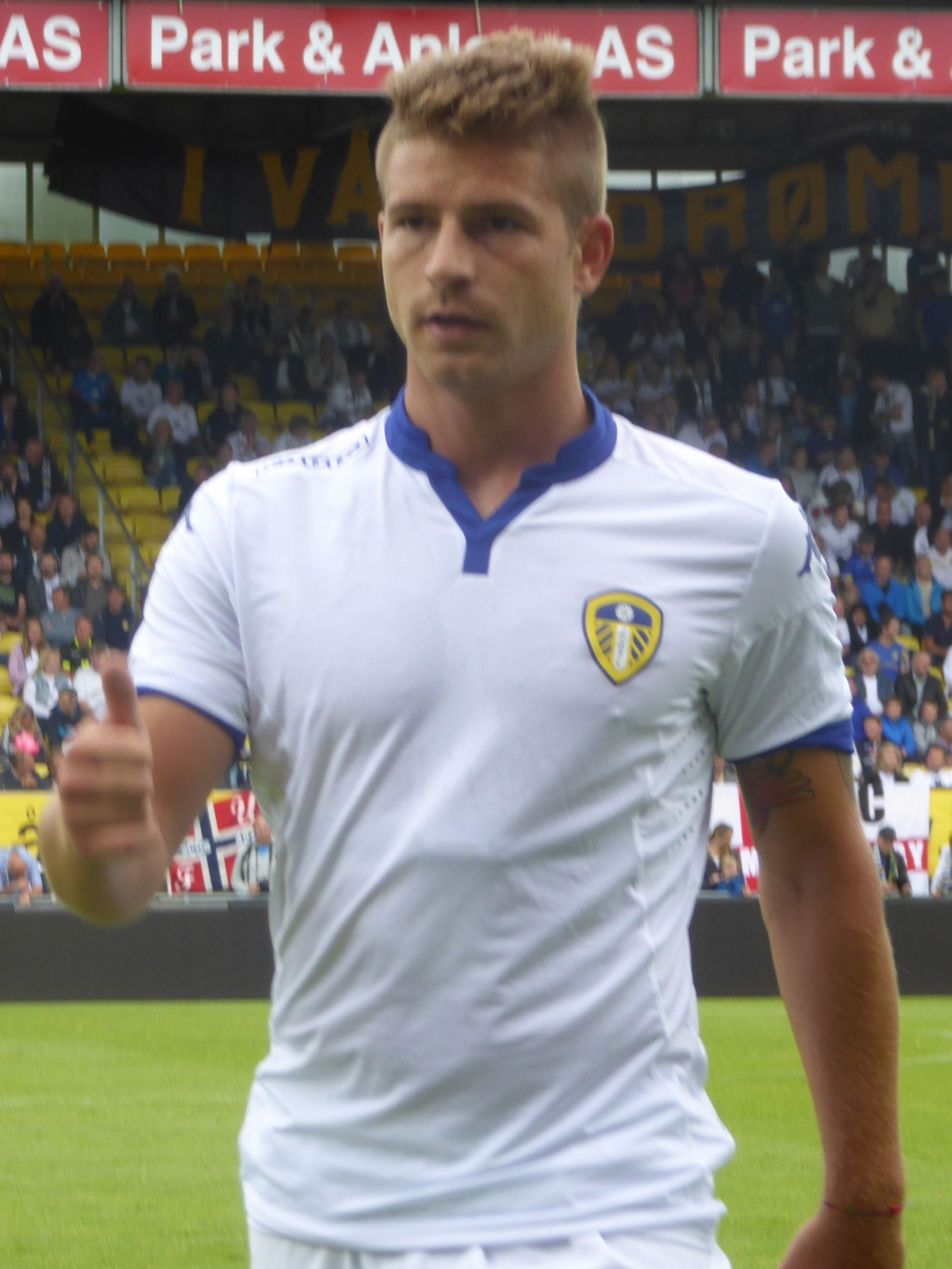
- Berardi playing for Leeds United in 2015

Personal information
- Full name: Gaetano Michel Berardi
- Date of birth: 21 August 1988 (age 38)
- Place of birth: Sorengo, Switzerland
- Height: 1.79 m (5 ft 10 in)
- Position: Defender

Youth career
- –2005: Lugano
- 2005–2007: Brescia

Senior career*
Years	Team	Apps	(Gls)
2007–2012	Brescia	112	(0)
2012–2014	Sampdoria	35	(0)
2014–2021	Leeds United	157	(2)
2022	Sion	9	(0)
2022–2023	Bellinzona	30	(0)
Total		343	(0)

International career
2007–2008	Switzerland U20	3	(0)
2008–2011	Switzerland U21	20	(0)
2011	Switzerland	1	(0)
- * Club domestic league appearances and goals

Gaetano Michel Berardi (born 21 August 1988) is a Swiss former professional footballer. A versatile defender, he played as a right-back, left-back or centre-back.

== Club career ==
=== Brescia ===
Born in Sorengo, Berardi started his career at Swiss club Lugano's youth team. In the summer of 2005, he was signed by Serie B side Brescia. Berardi made his professional debut on 30 June 2007, in a winning away game against Pescara (1–3).

In his first season, Berardi made ten appearances in all competitions under the management of Serse Cosmi. In the 2008–09 season, Berardi was used in 26 Serie B games. Before finally becoming a first team regular in Giuseppe Iachini team during the 2009–10 season, Brescia earned promotion to Serie A after beating Torino in the Serie B play-offs.

Berardi made his Serie A debut on 12 September 2010 in a 3–2 victory against Palermo. He made 26 starts in total for Brescia in Serie A, although Brescia were relegated at the end of the season after finishing in 19th position.

=== Sampdoria ===
Upon the opening of the January transfer window, Berardi signed for fellow Serie B side Sampdoria. Berardi made his debut in a 2–1 victory against Padova on 14 January. At the end of the 2011–12 season, Berardi gained his second promotion to Serie A after winning the Serie B play-offs by beating Varese 4–2 on aggregate in the two-legged play-off final.

The following season in Serie A, despite stiff competition from Italian international Lorenzo De Silvestri, Berardi made 21 appearances in Serie A during the 2012–13 season. However, after the club appointed Siniša Mihajlović as head coach in November 2013, Berardi lost his place in the starting lineup and only made five Serie A appearances during the subsequent 2013–14 season.

=== Leeds United ===
On 19 July 2014, English side Leeds United announced that they had signed Berardi on a two-year deal for an undisclosed fee. Club president Massimo Cellino confirmed that Berardi had taken a wage cut to join Leeds. Berardi made his Leeds debut on 12 August, starting the League Cup match against Accrington Stanley, but was sent off for a "mid-air sliding tackle" and received a three-match ban as a result. With regular right back Sam Byram suspended, Berardi was set to start against Bradford City on 27 August, but was ruled out after picking up a concussion the day before the game. His full league debut was in a 1–1 draw away at Birmingham City on 13 September. On 20 September, Berardi received his second red card in just his fourth game, after being sent off in a 3–0 win over local rivals Huddersfield Town. With regular left-back Charlie Taylor deployed forward into an attacking left wing position, during 2015 Berardi became a regular fixture in the left-back position for Leeds. Berardi finished the season in strong form at left-back, starting 10 of the last 11 games and becoming a fans' favourite for his performances.

On 21 September 2015, after becoming a highly popular player with the fans for his consistent displays at both right back or left back positions, Berardi signed a two-year contract extension with the club lasting until 2018. On 21 November, Berardi received another straight red card for Leeds in the 73rd-minute of a 1–0 home defeat to Rotherham United; after being left with a bloodied nose following an elbow to the face from Leon Best, Berardi pushed Best to the ground before being restrained by his teammates, with both players receiving a straight red card as a result. The ban was later reduced after appeal due to the severity of the elbow Berardi received from Best, provoking the reaction. After returning from suspension, Berardi suffered a torn ankle ligament on 14 December against Charlton Athletic which ruled him out for two months. After returning from injury, in April 2016, in the return fixture against Rotherham, Berardi – in similar circumstances to the reverse fixture – suffered a bloodied face/head injury after being elbowed by Rotherham striker Matt Derbyshire, which resulted in Derbyshire's being given a straight red, albeit in a 2–1 defeat for Leeds. Berardi was nominated for the Leeds United Player of the Year award, alongside Charlie Taylor, Liam Bridcutt, Mirco Antenucci and Lewis Cook, though it was awarded to Taylor, whilst he also finished second in the voting for the Yorkshire Evening Post Player of the Year award, runner-up to eventual winner Taylor.

Berardi missed the entirety of Leeds' 2016–17 pre-season friendlies due to injury, although he did return to the substitutes' bench for the final pre-season friendly against Italian side Atalanta. On 7 August, in the opening fixture of the season against Queens Park Rangers in a 3–0 defeat, Berardi was substituted early in the first half after picking up a hamstring injury. As a result of the hamstring injury, Berardi was ruled out for around six weeks. On 26 October 2016, he made his return when he started in Leeds' penalty shootout victory against Norwich City in the League Cup, after a dramatic 2–2 draw in normal time. However upon his return from injury, Berardi was kept out the side due to the impressive form of new right-back Luke Ayling. After an Achilles injury to regular left-back Taylor, on 29 December 2016 against Aston Villa, Berardi came into the side as a left back for a run of games. Berardi's form at left back managed to keep out the returning Taylor for the remainder of the season.

On 6 August 2017, Berardi suffered a dislocated shoulder in the 3–2 victory against Bolton Wanderers in the first game of the season, and had to be replaced by debutant Vurnon Anita in the first half. On 8 August, he signed a new three-year contract at the club, keeping him at Leeds until the end of the 2019–20 season. On 30 December 2017, Berardi was named as captain and made his 100th appearance for Leeds in the 1–0 defeat against Birmingham City. On 7 January 2018, Berardi again captaining Leeds scored his first goal for the club and his first ever professional career goal with a "low, swerving shot" from 25 yards in a 2–1 defeat against Newport County in the FA Cup. On 7 April 2018, Berardi who was captaining the side, was sent off for a two footed lunge on Sunderland's Callum McManaman, with the sending off being his third red card of the 2017–18 season, Berardi was given a five match ban, missing the final five games of the season. After missing 10 games combined through suspension for the 2017–18 season, Berardi apologised for his poor discipline in an interview with LUTV, stating that "it's not good enough for a senior professional player", adding that he will "stop making mistakes when I die".

Ahead of the 2018–19 season under new head coach Marcelo Bielsa, Berardi was training in a new position as a centre-back, and used during pre-season in his new position. He started the season as first choice centre back alongside Liam Cooper, keeping Pontus Jansson on the bench, however Berardi was ruled out for a number of weeks after picking up a knee injury against Middlesbrough on 31 August. After returning from injury after six weeks out injured, Berardi in only his second game back, picked up a separate serious injury on 24 October 2018 in a 2–0 win against Ipswich Town after suffering a hyperextention injury to the hamstring, which would rule him out for several months. Rob Price, Leeds' Head of Medicine, revealed the seriousness of the injury by revealing Berardi "tore his hamstring completely off the bone". During the 2018–19 season, Berardi played 13 matches across the regular season after an injury hit campaign, with Leeds finishing the regular season in third place despite spending the majority of the season in the automatic promotion places, and therefore qualifying for the promotion play-offs. Berardi started the Championship semi-final first leg as Leeds went 1–0 up away to Derby County, but was sent off in the 78th-minute of the second leg for a foul on Bradley Johnson as Leeds lost 4–2 (4–3 on aggregate). The red card was the seventh of Berardi's Leeds career, equalling Alan Smith as the most red-carded player in the club's history.

Berardi scored only the second goal of his career on 13 August in the EFL Cup tie against Salford City to help earn a 3–0 victory. He received his eighth red card for the club against Millwall on 5 October, at the time making him the most red-carded player in Leeds United history. However, the controversial red card was rescinded on appeal on 8 October. After the English professional football season was paused in March 2020 due to the global COVID-19 pandemic, the season was resumed during June, where Berardi earned promotion with Leeds to the Premier League as EFL Championship champions for the 2019–20 season. However, Berardi injured his anterior cruciate ligament (ACL) in the penultimate game of the season as Leeds defeated Derby County 3–1 on 17 July 2020; the injury was set to rule Berardi out for nine months.

Having signed a short extension to remain with Leeds during Project Restart, Berardi's contract expired at the end of the 2019–20 season. However, he was allowed to remain at the club's Thorp Arch training ground while completing his rehabilitation from the ACL injury, and on 16 October 2020 signed a new one-year contract for Leeds' first season back in the Premier League. He made his Premier league debut on 19 May 2021, coming on for Diego Llorente in a 2–0 win for Leeds away to Southampton. On 21 May, it was announced that Berardi would leave Leeds at the end of the season.

On 23 May, after a 3–1 home win against West Bromwich Albion, Berardi alongside teammate Pablo Hernandez officially departed Leeds, bidding farewell to their fans after making their final appearances for the club.

=== Sion ===
On 30 January 2022, Berardi returned to Switzerland, joining Sion on a short-term deal until the end of the 2021–22 season.

On 31 May 2023, Berardi announced his retirement from professional football at the age of 34.

== International career ==
Berardi with Switzerland U21 in 2011

After playing for the Switzerland national under-20 team, Berardi debuted for the Switzerland U21s against Greece on 19 November 2008.

Berardi played his first and only match for Switzerland at senior level against Liechtenstein on 10 August 2011.

== Career statistics ==
=== Club ===
Appearances and goals by club, season and competition
Club	Season	League			National cup		League cup		Other		Total	
Club	Season	Division	Apps	Goals	Apps	Goals	Apps	Goals	Apps	Goals	Apps	Goals
Brescia	2006–07	Serie B	1	0	0	0	0	0	—		1	0
Brescia	2007–08	Serie B	9	0	0	0	0	0	—		9	0
Brescia	2008–09	Serie B	25	0	1	0	0	0	—		26	0
Brescia	2009–10	Serie B	28	0	0	0	0	0	1 (Note: Appearance(s) in Serie B promotion play-offs)	0	29	0
Brescia	2010–11	Serie A	27	0	2	0	0	0	—		29	0
Brescia	2011–12	Serie B	13	0	1	0	0	0	—		14	0
Brescia	Total		103	0	4	0	0	0	1	0	108	0
Sampdoria	2011–12	Serie B	9	0	0	0	0	0	—		9	0
Sampdoria	2012–13	Serie A	21	0	0	0	0	0	—		21	0
Sampdoria	2013–14	Serie A	5	0	0	0	0	0	—		5	0
Sampdoria	Total		35	0	0	0	0	0	0	0	35	0
Leeds United	2014–15	Championship	22	0	1	0	1	0	—		24	0
Leeds United	2015–16	Championship	28	0	0	0	1	0	—		29	0
Leeds United	2016–17	Championship	26	0	1	0	2	0	—		29	0
Leeds United	2017–18	Championship	31	0	1	1	1	0	—		33	1
Leeds United	2018–19	Championship	13	0	0	0	0	0	2 (Note: Appearance(s) in Championship play-offs)	0	15	0
Leeds United	2019–20	Championship	22	0	1	0	2	1	—		25	1
Leeds United	2020–21	Premier League	2	0	0	0	0	0	—		2	0
Leeds United	Total		144	0	4	1	7	1	2	0	157	2
FC Sion	2021–22	Swiss Super League	8	0	0	0	—		—		8	0
Career total			292	0	8	1	7	1	3	0	310	2

=== International ===
Appearances and goals by national team and year
National team	Year	Apps	Goals
Switzerland	2011	1	0
Total		1	0

== Honours ==
Brescia

- Serie B Play-offs: 2009–10

Sampdoria

- Serie B play-offs: 2011–12

Leeds United

- EFL Championship: 2019–20
