= Charlie Taylor (footballer, born 1993) =

English footballer (born 1993)

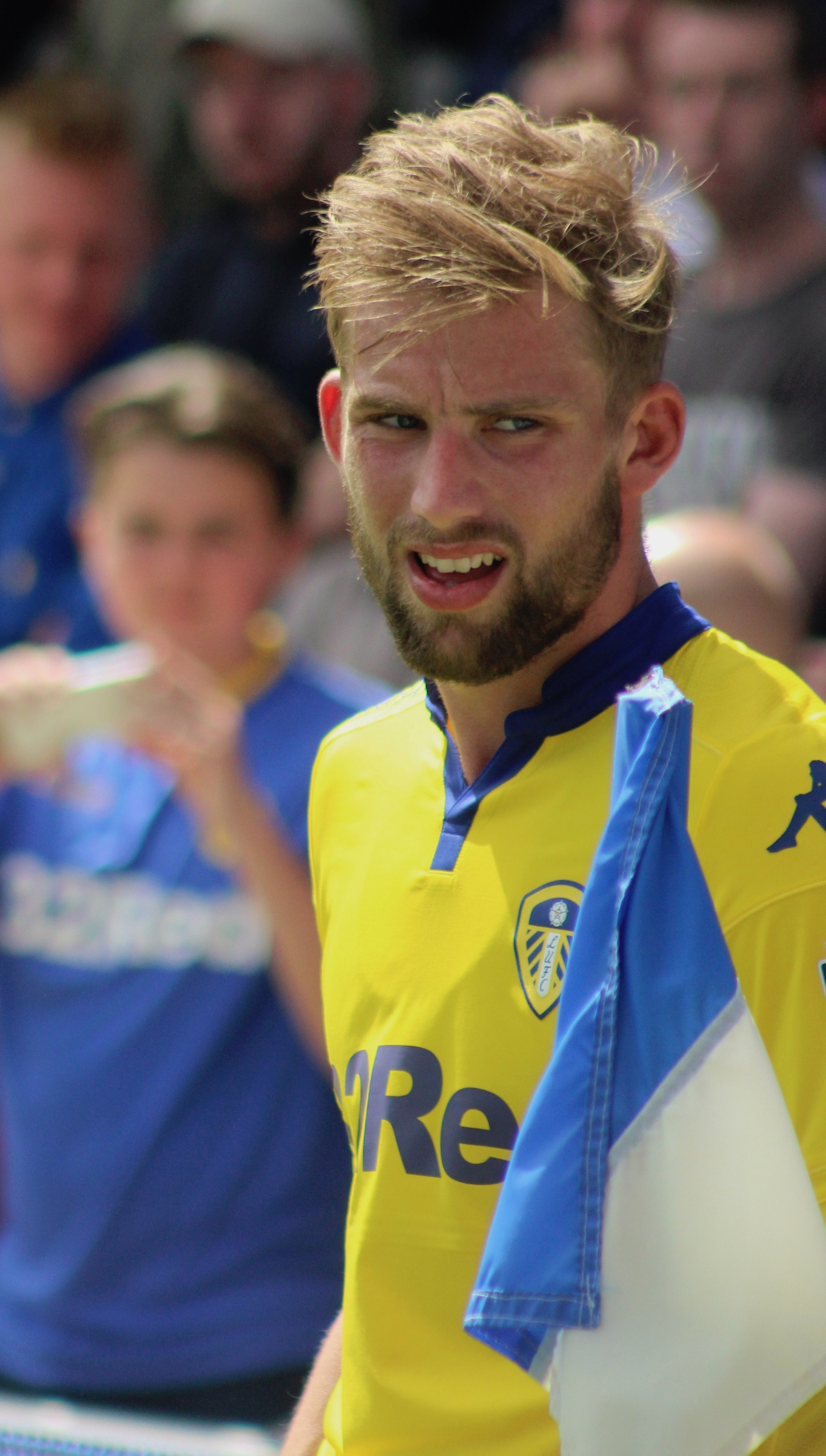
- Taylor with Leeds United in 2016

Personal information
- Full name: Charles James Taylor
- Date of birth: 18 September 1993 (age 33)
- Place of birth: York, England
- Height: 5 ft 9 in (1.76 m)
- Position: Left-back

Team information
- Current team: Derby County
- Number: 18

Youth career
- –2011: Leeds United

Senior career*
Years	Team	Apps	(Gls)
2011–2017	Leeds United	93	(3)
2012	→ Bradford City (loan)	3	(0)
2012	→ York City (loan)	4	(0)
2013	→ Inverness Caledonian Thistle (loan)	7	(0)
2013–2014	→ Fleetwood Town (loan)	32	(0)
2017–2024	Burnley	194	(1)
2024–2026	Southampton	8	(0)
2025–2026	→ West Bromwich Albion (loan)	26	(0)
2026–	Derby County	8	(0)

International career
2011	England U19	2	(0)
- * Club domestic league appearances and goals as of 16:18, 19 September 2026 (UTC)

Charles James Taylor (born 18 September 1993) is an English professional footballer who plays as a left-back for EFL Championship club Derby County.

Taylor is a product of the Leeds United academy and made his professional debut for the club in August 2011. He had loan spells with Bradford City, York City, Inverness Caledonian Thistle and Fleetwood Town. In 2017, Taylor joined Burnley. After making 220 appearances in all competitions for the club, he left Burnley and joined Southampton. Taylor spent the 2025–26 season on loan at West Brom. In July 2026, he joined Derby County. He has represented his country at under-19 level.

== Club career ==
=== Early career ===
Born in York, Taylor attended Tadcaster Grammar School and played in the junior teams at Leeds United before signing as a scholar with the club upon leaving school in the summer of 2010. During his first year in the youth team, Taylor was a regular for the under-18s, and in the second half of the 2010–11 season established himself in the reserve team, featuring in nine matches. While playing for the under-18s against Newcastle United he scored a goal which would be awarded the LFE's 2010–11 Academy & Youth Alliance Goal of the Season in April 2011, with LFE chief executive Alan Sykes describing it as an "incredible strike".

He capped his first year as a scholar by turning professional after signing a three-year contract at the club in May 2011. The length of the contract reflected the club's value of the player with fellow youngsters Alex Cairns and twins Lewis and Nathan Turner earning only one-year deals initially.

=== Senior debut and loan moves ===
At 17 years of age, Taylor made his first-team debut for Leeds as a second half substitute against local rivals Bradford City in the League Cup on 9 August 2011. He made his Championship debut for Leeds at left-back on 10 September against Crystal Palace, replacing the suspended Aidy White. He gained an assist for Ross McCormack's goal who scored the opener of the match in Leeds' 3–2 victory. Despite a promising debut, Taylor was dropped for the following match against Bristol City with White coming back into the team. Taylor was named as an unused substitute in the 3–0 loss against rivals Manchester United in the League Cup on 20 September 2011. His appearances in the senior team would lead Taylor to being called up to the England under-19 squad the following month for the Limoges Tournament.

Taylor joined League Two outfit Bradford City on an initial one-month loan on 1 January 2012 to gain further first-team experience. Bradford decided against extending the loan after it expired, having made four appearances.

Taylor joined hometown club York City, who were newly promoted to League Two, on an initial one-month loan on 30 August 2012. He made his debut two days later in a 3–1 home victory over Oxford United. Despite being second to Jamal Fyfield in the left-back pecking order, the loan was extended for a second month on 28 September 2012. Having made five appearances for York, Taylor returned to Leeds on 26 October 2012, shortly before the expiration of the loan.

He joined Scottish Premier League club Inverness Caledonian Thistle on loan until the end of the 2012–13 season on 25 January 2013.

==== Fleetwood Town (loan) ====
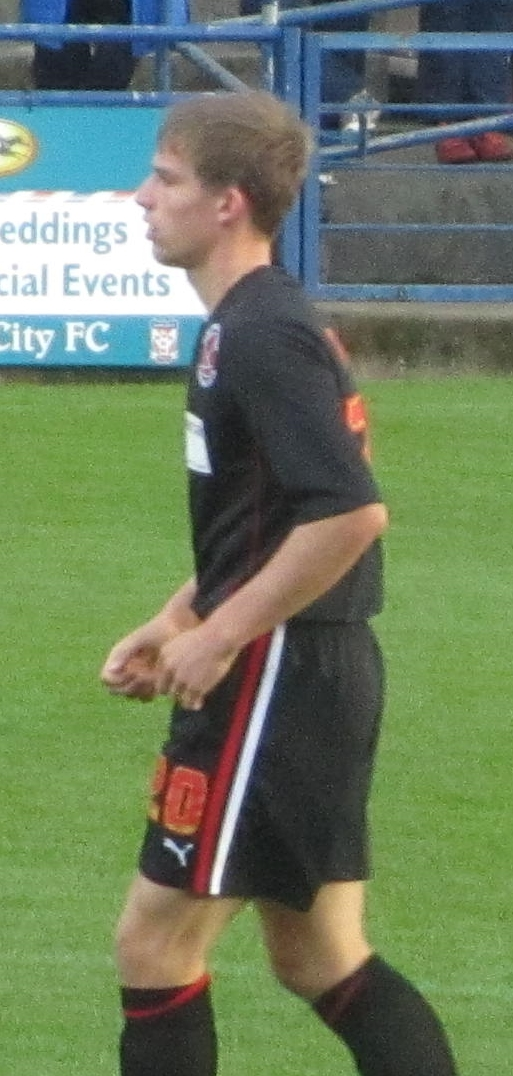
Taylor playing for Fleetwood Town in 2013

On 18 October 2013, Taylor joined Fleetwood Town on a one-month loan after being signed by manager Graham Alexander. Taylor made his debut for Fleetwood Town on the same day, playing in a 2–0 defeat against Southend United. After impressing in his first month at the club, on 6 November, Taylor's loan was extended until January 2014. After extending Taylor's loan, manager Graham Alexander announced his delight in being able to keep Taylor, with Taylor earning rave reviews for his performances. On 17 December, his loan was extended to the end of the season.

Taylor's form helped Fleetwood Town qualify for the play-off's with a fourth-placed finish in League Two. Fleetwood Town semi-final opponents were Taylor's old club York City, with Taylor revealing in an interview on 10 May that he wanted to prove people wrong at his former club. On 13 May, it was reported that Taylor had impressed new Leeds United owner Massimo Cellino who was looking at offering Taylor an extended three-year contract, with Taylor's current contract due to expire.

After helping guide Fleetwood Town to the League Two play-off's final against Burton Albion, on 20 May Taylor signed a three-year contract extension at his parent club Leeds United. The deal would keep Taylor at the club until 2017.

On 26 May, Taylor started the League Two play-off final against Burton Albion. Fleetwood gained promotion with a 1–0 victory after a goal from Taylor's teammate Antoni Sarcevic.

=== Leeds return ===
==== 2014–15 season ====
On 1 August, Taylor was assigned the number 21 shirt for the 2014–15 season. Taylor made his first start for Leeds since returning from loan on 12 August 2014, starting the League Cup match against Accrington Stanley. Taylor replaced Stephen Warnock in Leeds' 1–0 victory against Bolton Wanderers on 30 August.

After the then captain Stephen Warnock suffered an injury in a league match against Derby County on 30 December 2014, Taylor came back into the starting line-up on 4 January 2015 in Leeds' FA Cup 1–0 defeat against Sunderland. The form of Taylor coming into the team saw regular left-back Warnock sold to Derby.

After impressing at left-back, Taylor was played as a left winger for Leeds under Coach Neil Redfearn as part of a new 4–2–3–1 formation, with Gaetano Berardi filling in the left-back slot. Taylor scored his first goal for Leeds in a 4–3 loss against Wolverhampton Wanderers.

On 9 April, after rumoured Premier League interest in Taylor and teammates Lewis Cook, Alex Mowatt and Sam Byram, head coach Neil Redfearn challenged Leeds United's owners to keep a hold of their home grown talents.

Taylor scored his second goal for the club on 25 April in a 2–1 win against Yorkshire rivals Sheffield Wednesday. On 2 May 2015, Taylor was also nominated for Young Player of the Year Award, but missed out to Lewis Cook.

==== 2015–16 season ====
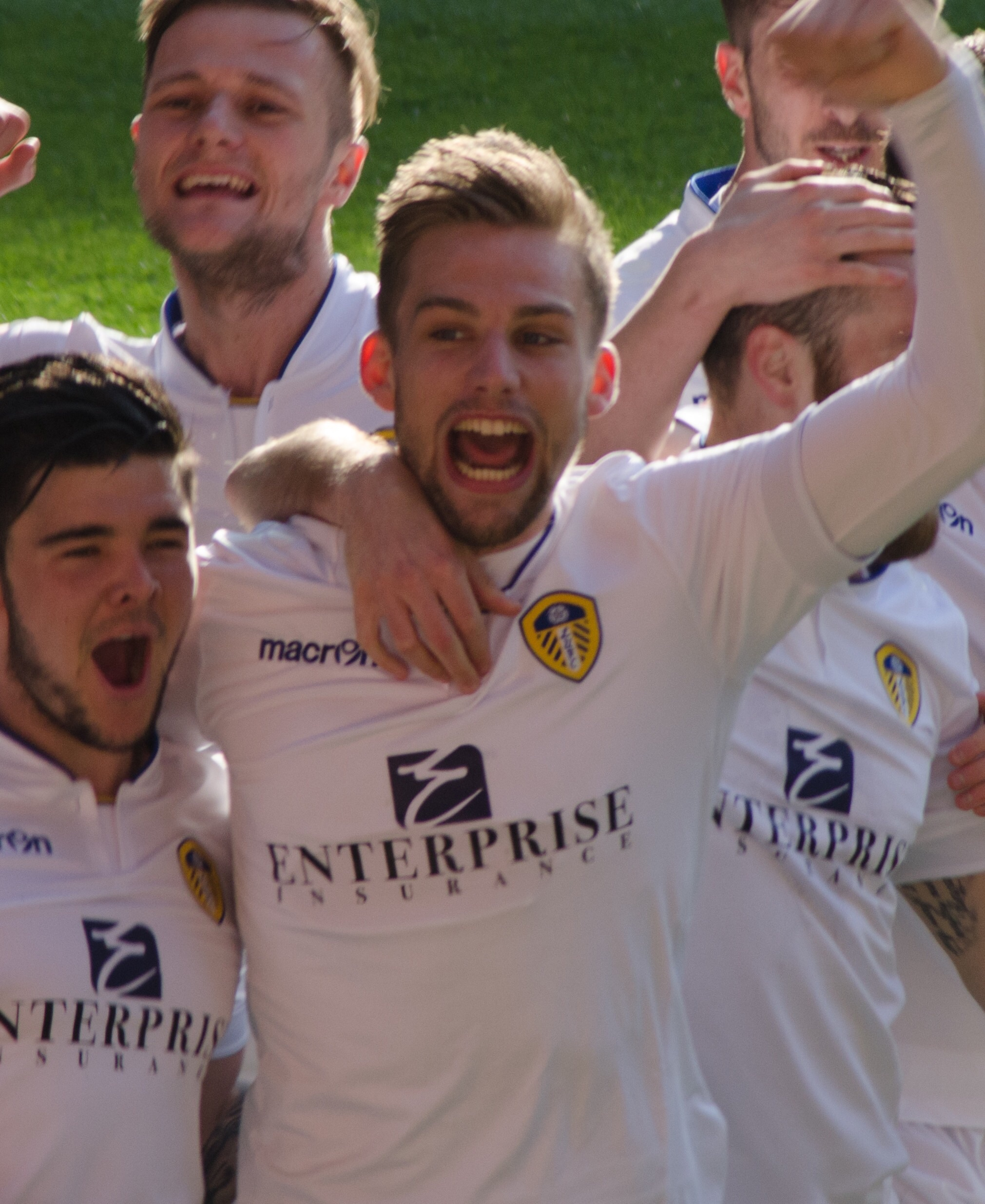
Taylor celebrating a goal for Leeds United in 2015

On 19 September 2015, Taylor scored the winner for Leeds against Milton Keynes Dons in a 2–1 victory, with an impressive solo goal running from his own half before scoring a left footed shot.

On 19 April, Taylor was nominated for the Leeds United player of the year award, alongside Mirco Antenucci, Liam Bridcutt, Gaetano Berardi and Lewis Cook.

On 30 April 2016, at the club's annual Player of the Year Awards, Taylor was named The Fans Player of the Year for the 2015–16 season. On the same day Taylor also won the Yorkshire Evening Post's Player of the Year Award.

After Taylor had been linked with several Premier League clubs including Liverpool, West Bromwich Albion and Stoke City, Leeds owner Massimo Cellino said in June 2016 that he had approached Taylor's agent about extending Taylors contract.

==== 2016–17 season ====
On 2 August 2016, with speculation still linking Taylor with a move to the Premier League, Leeds announced they had rejected a transfer request from Taylor to leave the club, with the club advising that chairman Massimo Cellino had said Taylor would not be sold. On 22 August, after Leeds's 2–0 victory against Sheffield Wednesday Taylor proclaimed I am contracted until the end of this season, so if they (Leeds) do not want to sell me, then I am under contract. It is up to them and their decision and if they keep me, then I will be until then.

Taylor stayed at the club. On 29 December 2016, Taylor missed his first Leeds match after 52 consecutive starts, in the match against Aston Villa in a 1–1 draw after picking up an achilles injury against Preston North End in the previous match. The injury would keep Taylor out for several months, also added to the form of Left-back Gaetano Berardi, Taylor was unable to reclaim his place in the team.

In the final match of the season with Leeds missing out on the play-offs bar an almost impossible mathematical goal difference swing, it was revealed by Head coach Garry Monk that Taylor had refused to play for Leeds in the final match. As a result of the refusal, Taylor was fined two weeks wages by the club with Monk proclaiming "I'm hugely disappointed with Charlie. I think he's been terribly advised all season."

On 17 May 2017, it was announced that Taylor had been offered a two-year contract with the club in line with EFL regulations.

=== Burnley ===
On 6 July 2017, Taylor signed a four-year contract with Premier League club Burnley. Since Taylor was under 24, Burnley owed Leeds United compensation, which was due to be set at a tribunal. On 25 July 2017, it was reported by the Yorkshire Evening Post that the clubs had agreed on a compensation of between £6 million and £7 million to be paid by Burnley to Leeds United for the player, avoiding the need for a tribunal decision.

On 28 October 2023, in a 2–1 loss to AFC Bournemouth, Taylor scored his first goal for Burnley in his 198th appearance for the club. On 21 May 2024, after Burnley's relegation, the club said they offered him a new contract.

=== Southampton ===
On 1 July 2024, Taylor signed a two-year contract with Premier League club Southampton, following the expiry of his contract at Burnley. He made his debut for the club on 24 August in a 1–0 home defeat against Nottingham Forest after he replaced Joe Aribo in the 76th minute.

On 1 September 2025, Taylor joined West Bromwich Albion on loan for the remainder of the season. He made his debut for the club on 26 September in a 1–1 draw with Leicester City. Following the conclusion of the 2025–26 season, Taylor was released from Southampton.

=== Derby County ===
On 14 July 2026, Taylor signed a one-year contract with Championship club Derby County. On 8 August 2026, Taylor made his debut for Derby County in a 2–1 EFL Cup defeat to Lincoln City.

== International career ==
In October 2011, Taylor made his debut for the England under-19 team, playing in two of the three matches in the Limoges Tournament to help England earn a win in the overall tournament. His debut came as a substitute against Portugal, before starting against Ukraine.

== Career statistics ==
As of match played 19 September 2026

Appearances and goals by club, season and competition
Club	Season	League			National Cup (Note: Includes FA Cup, Scottish Cup)		League Cup (Note: Includes Football League Cup/EFL Cup)		Other		Total	
Club	Season	Division	Apps	Goals	Apps	Goals	Apps	Goals	Apps	Goals	Apps	Goals
Leeds United	2011–12	Championship	2	0	0	0	2	0	—		4	0
Leeds United	2012–13	Championship	0	0	0	0	0	0	—		0	0
Leeds United	2013–14	Championship	0	0	—		0	0	—		0	0
Leeds United	2014–15	Championship	23	2	1	0	1	0	—		25	2
Leeds United	2015–16	Championship	39	1	3	0	1	0	—		43	1
Leeds United	2016–17	Championship	29	0	0	0	3	0	—		32	0
Leeds United	Total		93	3	4	0	7	0	—		104	3
Bradford City (loan)	2011–12	League Two	3	0	1	0	—		—		4	0
York City (loan)	2012–13	League Two	4	0	—		—		1 (Note: Appearance in Football League Trophy)	0	5	0
Inverness Caledonian Thistle (loan)	2012–13	Scottish Premier League	7	0	1	0	0	0	—		8	0
Fleetwood Town (loan)	2013–14	League Two	32	0	3	0	—		7 (Note: Four appearances in Football League Trophy, three in League Two play-offs)	0	42	0
Burnley	2017–18	Premier League	11	0	1	0	2	0	—		14	0
Burnley	2018–19	Premier League	38	0	2	0	0	0	5 (Note: Appearances in UEFA Europa League)	0	45	0
Burnley	2019–20	Premier League	24	0	1	0	1	0	—		26	0
Burnley	2020–21	Premier League	29	0	0	0	3	0	—		32	0
Burnley	2021–22	Premier League	31	0	0	0	1	0	—		32	0
Burnley	2022–23	Championship	33	0	5	0	3	0	—		41	0
Burnley	2023–24	Premier League	28	1	1	0	1	0	—		30	1
Burnley	Total		194	1	10	0	11	0	5	0	220	1
Southampton	2024–25	Premier League	8	0	0	0	2	0	—		10	0
Southampton	2025–26	Championship	0	0	0	0	2	0	—		2	0
Southampton	Total		8	0	0	0	4	0	—		12	0
West Bromwich Albion (loan)	2025–26	Championship	26	0	2	0	—		—		28	0
Derby County	2026–27	Championship	8	0	0	0	1	0	—		9	0
Career total			374	4	21	0	23	0	13	0	431	4

== Honours ==
Fleetwood Town

- Football League Two play-offs: 2014

Burnley

- EFL Championship: 2022–23

Individual

- Leeds United Player of the Year: 2015–16
