= Tadcaster Grammar School =

Location
- Toulston; Tadcaster, North Yorkshire, LS24 9NB; England; 53.87786°N 1.30734°W

Information
- Type: Comprehensive; Academy
- Motto: Be your best self
- Established: 1557; 469 years ago
- Founder: Owen Oglethorpe
- Local authority: North Yorkshire
- Trust: The STAR Multi Academy Trust
- Department for Education URN: 145777 Tables
- Ofsted: Reports
- Head teacher: J.P. Craig
- Gender: Coeducational
- Age: 11 to 18
- Enrolment: approx. 1,600 pupils
- Website: https://tgs.starmat.uk/

Tadcaster Grammar School founded in 1557, is a coeducational comprehensive secondary school and sixth form located near Tadcaster, North Yorkshire, England, educating children aged 11–18 years old, and has an on-site sixth form. The school is located in the hamlet of Toulston just outside the brewery town of Tadcaster. The school's catchment includes Tadcaster and its surrounding villages, while traditionally taking pupils from the York area, including villages such as Appleton Roebuck, Copmanthorpe, Bishopthorpe and Bilbrough.

== History ==
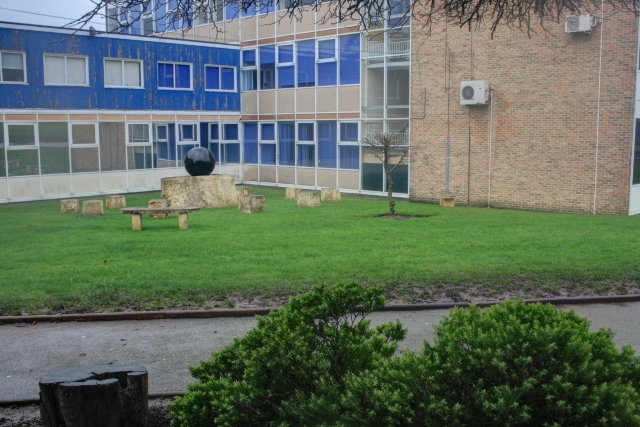
Tadcaster Grammar School buildings in 2014.

The school was founded in 1557 by Owen Oglethorpe, Bishop of Carlisle, as a boys' school in Tadcaster. It merged with Dawson's Girls' School in 1906

In 1955, as a bilateral school it first admitted comprehensive students around Tadcaster, while continuing to select academic students from more distant parts of its catchment. It was one of the first comprehensive schools in the country.

By 1956, the school had become too big for its Tadcaster premises and started to expand into the current location when West Riding County Council acquired Toulston Lodge just outside the town. Initially, rooms in the Lodge were converted to classrooms and laboratories. It remained a two site school until 1959/60 when it moved wholly to purpose-built new buildings at Toulston. John Smith's Brewery absorbed the Tadcaster site.

As of 2024, Toulston Lodge retains its original fireplaces and skylight with wooden elephant surround. It is claimed the house belonged to Oliver Cromwell.

Since 2000, new school buildings added include a science block, library and an extension to the design technology block. In addition, a new sixth-form block was constructed which also houses religious education classrooms, and there is a new entrance area with three business classrooms. Overall it includes three business rooms, one law room, three computer rooms, two science classrooms and three religious education rooms. In 2020, the religious education classrooms were converted to life skills classrooms, as the former rooms were moved to be closer to other humanities.

During the summer of 2006 a new entrance was built with automatic doors, a new disabled ramp was built for access to the science block and a new path was built along the school car park to the pottery shed. Also, during summer 2009, a new disabled ramp was built for access into the English temporary buildings. New wooden fencing was added in and around the school car park. Another addition to the school was a wooden sculpture at the entrance. This was erected in memory of the fallen Old Tree, formerly a school landmark since the change of site in 1960.

The school became a specialist Business and Enterprise College in 2003 and received High Performing Specialist School Status in 2007, with the school achieving some of the best GCSE and A-Level results in the county of North Yorkshire. In May 2012 the school received an Ofsted rating of 'Good' overall, with 'Outstanding' behaviour and safety of pupils. The school has retained its name but is now a comprehensive school. Originally under the grammar school system, pupils who failed their 11-plus exam would have attended Wetherby Secondary Modern School. Since Tadcaster is now in the district of Selby and Wetherby is in the City of Leeds, it is a difficult and bureaucratic process to educate pupils on the opposite side of the borderline to where they live. The school is most commonly organised through horizontal year group forms, dictated by the five houses. The houses include the established houses of Oglethorpe and Dawson, named after the two merging schools' founders, Fairfax, after the English Civil War commander-in-chief and alumnus Thomas Fairfax and Calcaria, the Roman name for Tadcaster, and Toulston, whose name was selected by pupils. Another house, Wharfe, previously existed but was removed at the end of the 2019/2020 academic year; it was introduced at the same time as Toulston and was also named by students.

Previously a community school administered by North Yorkshire County Council, in May 2018 Tadcaster Grammar School converted to academy status. The school is now sponsored by The STAR Multi Academy Trust.

From 2019 to 2026, the headteacher was Andrew Parkinson. The new head is John Paul Craig since 2026.

In the Autumn of 2024, following the tragic passing of a Year 11 Student, Tadcaster Grammar School planted a new tree in front of Toulston Lodge in her honour.

== Houses ==
School houses, into which the pupils of Tadcaster Grammar School are divided, are:

- Oglethorpe House – after Owen Oglethorpe, Bishop of Carlisle, and founder of the school in 1557. Green
- Dawson House – after Dawson's Girls' School, with which Tadcaster Grammar School was merged. Yellow
- Fairfax House – after English Civil War commander-in-chief and alumnus Thomas Fairfax. Blue
- Calcaria House – after the Roman name for Tadcaster. Red
- Toulston House – after school building Toulston Lodge, former residence of Oliver Cromwell. Orange

== Former pupils ==
Alumni of Tadcaster Grammar School are referred to as 'Old Tadites'. Some notable 'Tadites' include:

- Ruby Barker – actress
- Ed Bicknell – musician
- Paul Blomfield – politician
- Rick Broadbent – journalist
- David Brown – footballer
- Aidan Butterworth – footballer
- Lewis Cook – international footballer
- Jon Craig – political journalist
- Thomas Fairfax, 3rd Lord Fairfax of Cameron – English Civil War commander-in-chief
- Mark Ford – footballer
- Glamour of the Kill – heavy rock band
- Grammatics – alternative rock band
- Ross Greenwood – footballer
- Charles Hague, violinist and composer
- Matthew Kilgallon – footballer
- Alison Lloyd – fashion designer and founder of Ally Capellino
- Thomas Potter – industrialist and politician
- Humphrey Smith – brewer
- John and Samuel Smith – founders of John Smith's Brewery and Samuel Smith Old Brewery
- Thomas Staniforth – footballer
- Adelle Stripe – writer
- Charlie Taylor – footballer
- Rory Watson – footballer
- Mark Westaby – strongman
