= Sam Byram =

English footballer (born 1993)

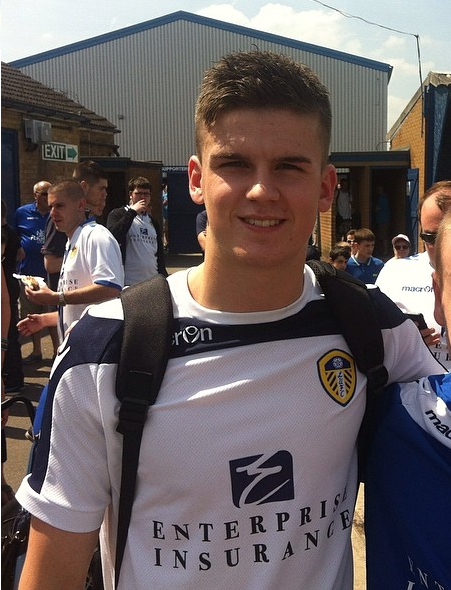
- Byram with Leeds United in 2014

Personal information
- Full name: Samuel Mark Byram
- Date of birth: 16 September 1993 (age 33)
- Place of birth: Thurrock, England
- Height: 5 ft 11 in (1.80 m)
- Positions: Left-back; right-back

Team information
- Current team: Middlesbrough
- Number: 3

Youth career
- 2005–2012: Leeds United

Senior career*
Years	Team	Apps	(Gls)
2012–2016	Leeds United	130	(9)
2016–2019	West Ham United	27	(0)
2018–2019	→ Nottingham Forest (loan)	6	(0)
2019–2023	Norwich City	47	(1)
2023–2026	Leeds United	71	(3)
2026–	Middlesbrough	3	(0)
- * Club domestic league appearances and goals as of 18:40, 21 November 2026 (GMT)

Samuel Mark Byram (born 16 September 1993) is an English professional footballer who plays as a full-back for EFL Championship club Middlesbrough.

== Club career ==
Byram was born in Thurrock, Essex, before moving north, where he attended Ralph Butterfield Primary School in Haxby and then Joseph Rowntree School in York. He played for the City Schools team as a boy before joining Leeds United. After completing his secondary education at school, he signed scholar forms with the West Yorkshire club in 2010. During his first year as scholar, he played 'down' a year in the under-16 team to help his development as a footballer.

He later progressed to his age group in the under-18s where he would become a regular in the team during his second year in 2011–12. As an integral part of the team, he scored several goals over the course of the season as the under-18s finished as runners-up to Newcastle United in their divisional academy league. Following the end of the season in May 2012, he was one of five young players rewarded with their first professional contracts for their performances in the campaign.

=== Leeds United ===
==== 2012–13 season ====
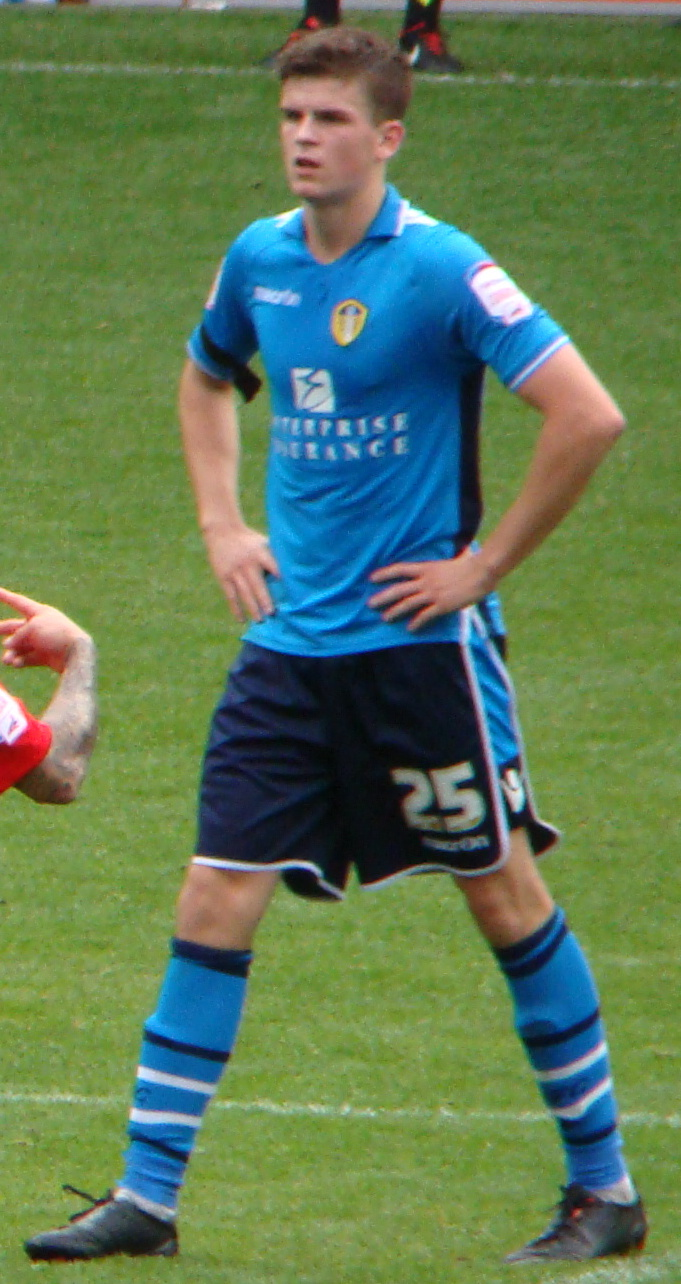
Byram playing for Leeds United in 2012

In the first friendly match of Leeds United's 2012–13 pre-season against Farsley Celtic, Byram was one of a number of youngsters given an opportunity to impress manager Neil Warnock when he lined up for the second half at Throstle Nest. United recorded a convincing 5–2 victory over their city rivals. Nevertheless, he would travel with the first-team on their pre season tour of the South West of England the following week, featuring in the games against Tavistock, Bodmin Town and Torquay United. Byram remained as part of the first-team in pre-season after returning to the North; playing for an hour and scoring in the game away to Preston North End.

After impressing in pre-season, Byram was handed the number 25 shirt for the season ahead and he made his first team debut at Elland Road in a 4–0 victory over Shrewsbury Town on 11 August in the League Cup. Byram retained his place in the first-team the following week in United's first league game of the campaign against Wolverhampton Wanderers. He was part of a defence that kept a clean-sheet in a 1–0 victory over one of the early favourites for promotion and his performance out-wide against the England international Matt Jarvis won praise from several observers. He signed a new three-year contract with the West Yorkshire club two days after his league debut and only three months after signing his first professional contract with the club.

Byram scored his first professional goal on 28 August in the 3–0 League Cup second-round victory over Oxford United. Picking up the ball just outside the penalty area, he beat two Oxford defenders with his first and second touches before chipping the goalkeeper from inside the box in the 34th minute to give his team a 2–0 lead. An impressed Neil Warnock told reporters after the game that "Sam will probably never score another goal like that in his career". This goal was later voted as Leeds' Goal of the Year for 2012. Byram remained a permanent feature in the first-team squad during the early months of the season with United legend Eddie Gray tipping him to win a call-up to England Under-21 squad in the near future if he maintained his form. His former manager in the under-18s, Neil Redfearn, stated that Byram's rise through the ranks at the club served as a good example for other promising youngsters including his former teammates in the academy side, Ross Killock, Dominic Poleon and Simon Lenighan. On 2 October, he scored his first league goal for Leeds in a 2–2 draw away to Bolton Wanderers, heading in a cross from El Hadji Diouf. An away match at Leicester City on 5 March saw young Byram score his third goal for Leeds in a 1–1 draw.

After his impressive form for Leeds linked him with Premier League interest, Byram signed a new contract with Leeds on 26 January 2013, to extend his stay at the club until 2016. He scored his second league goal for the club on 6 March, in a 1–1 draw away at Leicester City, and followed this up with the equaliser in another 1–1 draw, at home to Peterborough United.

On 26 April 2013, Byram won the Yorkshire Evening Post Player of the Season award with 99% of the vote. After being linked with an £8 million move to Manchester City in the summer, Byram proclaimed that he wanted to stay at Leeds to try earn promotion.

At the club's annual end of season awards on 27 April, Byram won the Player of the Year Award, Young Player of the Year Award, Players Player of the Year Award and also the Supporters Club Player of the Year Award.

On 30 July 2013, Bryam was named in Sky Sports Football League Players to watch out for in the Football League.

==== 2013–14 season ====
The hip injury sustained at the end of the 2012–13 season ruled Byram out of the England under-20's World Cup. Byram's injury caused him to miss the entire 2013–14 pre-season friendlies for Leeds. After missing the start of the 2013–14 season, on 6 August Leeds manager Brian McDermott announced that Byram had an injection in his hip and the injury may require surgery which could potentially rule him out for several months.

Byram made his first-team return on 21 September 2013, playing 57 minutes in Leeds' 2–1 defeat against Burnley. He also played Leeds' next game, a League Cup defeat to Newcastle United, playing the full 90 minutes. Byram played just 27 games during an injury hit season.

==== 2014–15 season ====
On 1 August, Byram was assigned the Leeds number 2 shirt for the 2014–15 season. On 9 August, Southampton manager Ronald Koeman confirmed that Leeds had rejected a bid of £4.5 million to sign Byram. Byram was given a straight red card on 23 August against Watford for an off the ball incident with Watford defender Daniel Pudil.

Byram scored his fourth goal for Leeds in a 2–1 win against Huddersfield Town on 31 January. In 2015, head coach Neil Redfearn changed Leeds' formation to a 4–2–3–1 with Byram moved forward into an attacking right wing position, with Scott Wootton played as the regular right back. Byram scored the second goal in a 2–0 away win over Reading on 10 February. On 18 March 2015, Byram scored for Leeds United against Fulham in a 3–0 away victory.

On 9 April, after rumoured Premier League interest in Byram and teammates Lewis Cook, Charlie Taylor and Alex Mowatt, head coach Neil Redfearn challenged Leeds United's owners to keep a hold of their homegrown talents.

On 2 May 2015, Byram was one of five players nominated for the Fans Player of the Year Award at Leeds United's official end of 2014–15 season awards ceremony, but lost out to eventual winner Alex Mowatt. Byram was also nominated for Young Player of the Year Award, but missed out on the Young Player of the Year award to Lewis Cook.

==== 2015–16 season ====
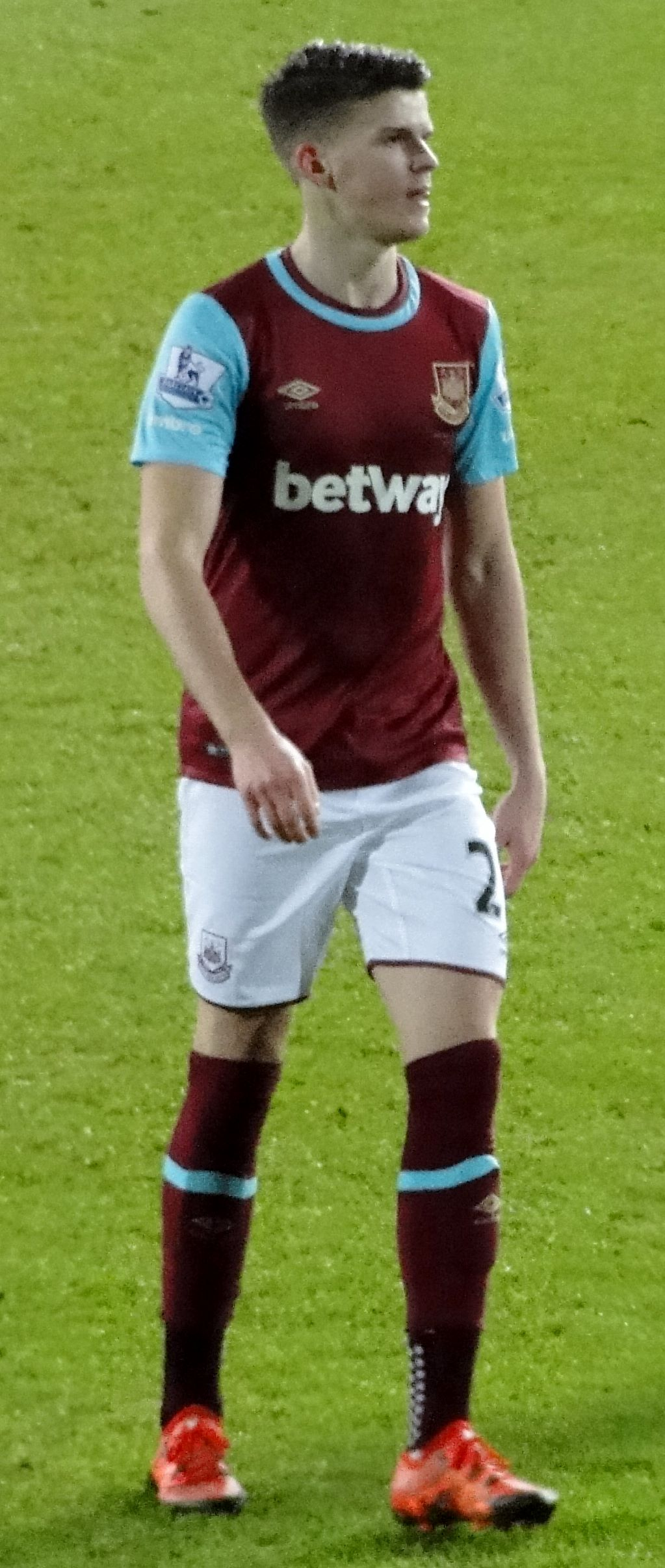
Byram with West Ham United, January 2016

Byram started the pre-season for Leeds playing as a right forward in new manager Uwe Rösler's 4–3–3 formation. On 31 July 2015, Rösler revealed that despite speculation linking Byram to Premier League clubs, that he was not looking to sell the player and that he was an important player for the club. On 12 August 2015, Byram missed a penalty in a penalty shootout against Doncaster Rovers in the League Cup, with Leeds losing 4–2 on penalties after a 1–1 draw.

On 22 September 2015, Byram was criticised by Leeds owner Massimo Cellino who revealed he was "deeply offended" and "hurt" that Byram had not signed a new contract with the club. The Yorkshire Evening Post reported that the contract offer from Cellino to Byram was actually a reduction on his existing wage on a long-term deal. On 5 December 2015, Bryam turned down a further contract offer, with the offer being just a one-year extension, however parity of his current wage.

On 17 December 2015, Byram scored a brace in the match against Wolverhampton Wanderers to seal Leeds' 3–2 win. On 27 December, Byram scored in the match against Nottingham Forest to end the match at 1–1.

On 5 January 2016, Byram was named Championship Player of the Month for December 2015 after scoring three goals and making assists throughout the month. After being subject to enquiries from Premier League clubs, on 7 January 2016 Leeds manager Steve Evans revealed that he wanted to keep Byram at the club but that club owner Massimo Cellino had advised the enquiries had not been concrete enough for a move to happen. Byram left Leeds in January 2016. He had played 143 games in all competitions for them, scoring 10 goals.

=== West Ham United ===
==== 2015–16 season ====
Byram signed for Premier League club West Ham United on a four-and-a-half-year contract for an undisclosed fee on 20 January 2016. He made his West Ham debut as a 13th-minute substitute for the injured Carl Jenkinson on 23 January in a 2–2 draw against Manchester City. In his post-match interview, manager Slaven Bilić revealed that Byram had not been in the matchday squad but was a late inclusion following an injury to James Tomkins.

==== 2016–17 season ====
On 29 July 2016, Byram made his first start and appearance of the season in a 2–1 defeat against Slovenian Domžale in the first leg of the UEFA Europa League third qualifying round tie.

=== Nottingham Forest loan ===
On 10 August 2018, Byram joined Nottingham Forest on loan for the remainder of the 2018–19 season. He made his debut for Forest on 14 August in the first round of the 2018–19 EFL Cup against Bury. The game finished 1–1 after 90 minutes with Forest going through to the second round 10–9 on penalties, one of which Byram scored for Forest.

=== Norwich City ===
On 16 July 2019, Byram joined Norwich City on a four-year deal for a reported £750,000. On 17 September 2022, Byram scored his first goal for Norwich when a shot from Teemu Pukki deflected off him and into the goal.

On 5 May 2023, Norwich announced that Byram would leave the club at the end of the season following the expiry of his contract.

Following Byram's release, he made three pre-season appearances for former club Leeds United ahead of the 2023–24 season.

=== Return to Leeds United ===
On 5 August 2023, Byram re-joined Leeds United, signing a contract until June 2024.

Byram scored his first goal since returning to Leeds on 23 September 2023, a header in Leeds' 3–0 win over Watford.

In June 2024, Byram's contract at Leeds was extended for a further year.

Byram scored his only goal of the 2024–25 Championship season in the 10th minute of a 3–0 win against Luton Town on 27 November 2024.

On 3 May 2025, Byram won The Championship title with Leeds United following a 2–1 victory over Plymouth Argyle at Home Park. His contract with Leeds expired at the end of June 2025. However, on 8 July he signed a new contract for the duration of the 2025–26 season.

== International career ==
On 17 May 2013, Byram was called up to the England under-20 team by Peter Taylor for the 2013 FIFA U-20 World Cup in Turkey. On 11 June, however, he withdrew as a precaution due to a hip injury sustained towards the end of the 2012–13 season.

== Career statistics ==
As of match played 17 May 2026

Appearances and goals by club, season and competition
Club	Season	League			FA Cup		League Cup		Other		Total	
Club	Season	Division	Apps	Goals	Apps	Goals	Apps	Goals	Apps	Goals	Apps	Goals
Leeds United	2012–13	Championship	44	3	4	0	5	1	—		53	4
Leeds United	2013–14	Championship	25	0	1	0	1	0	—		27	0
Leeds United	2014–15	Championship	39	3	0	0	0	0	—		39	3
Leeds United	2015–16	Championship	22	3	1	0	1	0	—		24	3
Leeds United	Total		130	9	6	0	7	1	—		143	10
West Ham United	2015–16	Premier League	4	0	—		—		—		4	0
West Ham United	2016–17	Premier League	18	0	0	0	0	0	4 (Note: Appearances in UEFA Europa League)	0	22	0
West Ham United	2017–18	Premier League	5	0	2	0	3	0	—		10	0
West Ham United	Total		27	0	2	0	3	0	4	0	36	0
Nottingham Forest (loan)	2018–19	Championship	6	0	0	0	2	0	—		8	0
Norwich City	2019–20	Premier League	17	0	2	0	1	0	—		20	0
Norwich City	2020–21	Championship	0	0	0	0	0	0	—		0	0
Norwich City	2021–22	Premier League	15	0	3	0	0	0	—		18	0
Norwich City	2022–23	Championship	15	1	0	0	1	0	—		16	1
Norwich City	Total		47	1	5	0	2	0	—		54	1
Leeds United	2023–24	Championship	33	2	2	0	1	0	1 (Note: Appearance in Championship play-offs)	0	37	2
Leeds United	2024–25	Championship	36	1	2	0	1	0	—		39	1
Leeds United	2025–26	Premier League	2	0	2	0	1	0	—		5	0
Leeds United	Total		71	3	6	0	3	0	1	0	80	3
Career total			281	13	19	0	17	1	5	0	322	14

== Honours ==
Leeds United

- EFL Championship: 2024–25

Individual

- Leeds United Goal of the Year: 2012
- Leeds United Player of the Year: 2012–13
