= Mirco Antenucci =

Italian footballer

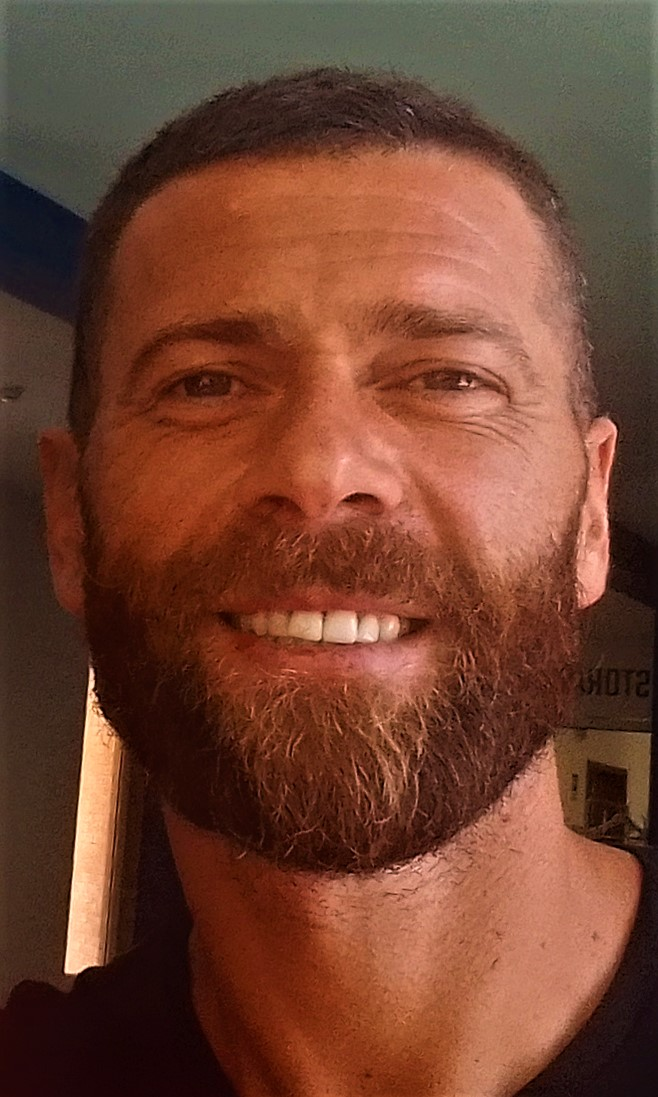
- Antenucci in 2018

Personal information
- Full name: Mirco Antenucci
- Date of birth: 8 September 1984 (age 42)
- Place of birth: Termoli, Italy
- Height: 1.80 m (5 ft 11 in)
- Position: Forward

Senior career*
Years	Team	Apps	(Gls)
2002–2007	Giulianova	92	(12)
2004–2005	→ Ancona (loan)	26	(2)
2007–2011	Catania	18	(1)
2007–2008	→ Venezia (loan)	27	(6)
2009	→ Pisa (loan)	20	(1)
2009–2010	→ Ascoli (loan)	40	(24)
2011–2012	Torino	60	(16)
2012–2014	Catania	1	(0)
2012–2013	→ Spezia (loan)	33	(6)
2013–2014	Ternana	40	(19)
2014–2016	Leeds United	75	(19)
2016–2019	SPAL	105	(34)
2019–2023	Bari	126	(58)
2023–2025	SPAL	72	(16)
- * Club domestic league appearances and goals

Mirco Antenucci (born 8 September 1984) is an Italian former professional footballer who played as a forward.

== Club career ==
=== Giulianova ===
Antenucci began his professional career in 2002, with Serie C1 club, Giulianova, where in two seasons with the club, the young striker managed to make 35 appearances, before spending the 2004–05 season on loan at Serie C2 side, Ancona. During his loan spell with the club, Antenucci scored twice in 27 league appearances, before returning to Giulianova in the summer of 2005. In his second tenure with the Teramo-based club, Antenucci scored 12 goals in 57 league matches, over the course of two seasons.

=== Catania ===
In July 2007, he was signed by Serie A side, Catania, and was loaned to Venezia ahead of the 2007–08 Serie C1 campaign. He made 27 league appearances that season, scoring six goals.

On 1 July 2008, Antenucci returned to Catania and entered into the first team squad. He made four substitute appearances under, then coach, Walter Zenga in the first half of the 2008–09 Serie A season. On 5 January 2009, Mirko Antenucci was sent out on loan to Serie B club Pisa, to gain experience and playing time. During his six-month spell with the Serie B club, Antenucci scored just one goal in 20 league appearances, and the club failed to avoid relegation and also bankrupted. He returned to Catania on 30 June 2009.

On 19 August 2009, Catania opted to send Antenucci on another loan deal to Ascoli, where he joined fellow Catania loanees Marcello Gazzola and Vito Falconieri. Following his transfer to Ascoli, he thrived, earning a regular starting role, and going on to make 40 appearances in the league, scoring an impressive 24 goals, finishing the second top scorer in the whole of Serie B. He only missed two league matches: the first round of the season and once due to suspension. He returned to Catania ahead of the 2010–11 Serie A season. Antenucci did make 14 league appearances for Catania that season, although most of them were off the substitute's bench with Maxi López, Francesco Lodi, Gonzalo Bergessio and Takayuki Morimoto competing for places up front. After just one goal in Serie A, Antenucci was sent out on a co-ownership agreement during the January transfer window.

=== Torino ===
On 23 January 2011, it was announced that he joined Serie B club Torino in a co-ownership deal. In his first 6-month spell with the club, Antenucci scored 6 goals in his first 19 appearances, before turning in an additional 10 goals in 40 league appearances the following season. Forming a strong strike partnership with Rolando Bianchi. His efforts helped guide the club to a second-placed finish in the 2011–12 Serie B standings with promotion to Serie A.

=== Return to Catania ===
On 21 June 2012, Catania outbid Torino in a blind auction for the players' co-ownership, and so the 28-year-old returned to Sicily ahead of the 2012–13 Serie A season. After making a substitute appearance in matchday one of the season on 26 August 2012, the player was sent out on loan to Spezia of Serie B, on yet another season-long loan deal, and finished the season with six goals in 33 league matches.

=== Ternana ===
Antenucci was sold in a co-ownership deal and loaned to Serie B side Ternana on 20 July 2013, where he was also named captain. He scored his first goal in the first round against Carpi, a penalty kick. The following game he scored against Cittadella with a goal in a 2–2 draw. Antenucci also scored on the fifth, sixth and ninth day respectively against Siena, Brescia and Virtus Lanciano. After one win in nine games, Ternana found themselves in the relegation zone. He scored a brace during a resounding 5–0 victory over Novara and the next week, repeated the feat with another brace against Crotone.

In the first half of the season, Antenucci had scored nine goals in 21 games. In the second round, the Terni technical changes, passing the leadership in the hands of Attilio Tesser. Antenucci begins with a bang, the second round, scoring six goals in eleven games, which helped Ternana to remain undefeated for twelve games.

On 5 April 2013, he missed his second penalty of the season (the first against Latina) and again against Cesena, the defeat saw the end of Ternana's undefeated spell of 12 games. He returned to goal scoring form on the 36th day, in a 3–3 draw against Modena and repeated his goal scoring form in subsequent games against Bari and Padova respectively.

His goal against Spezia in a 2–2 draw on 22 March 2014, where he controlled a ball on his chest before striking a bicycle kick, was awarded by The News Strip as Goal of The Year. Sky Sport Italia voted the goal second place for Goal of the Season behind Paul Pogba's strike for Juventus against Napoli.

After scoring 19 goals in 40 Serie B appearances for the rossoverde, he finished the fifth top scorer in Serie B for the 2013–14 season helping Ternana avoid relegation with a 16th-placed finish.

His contract was redeemed by the Umbrian club upon the conclusion of the co-ownership agreement on 20 June 2014, for an undisclosed fee.

=== Leeds United ===
==== 2014–15 season ====
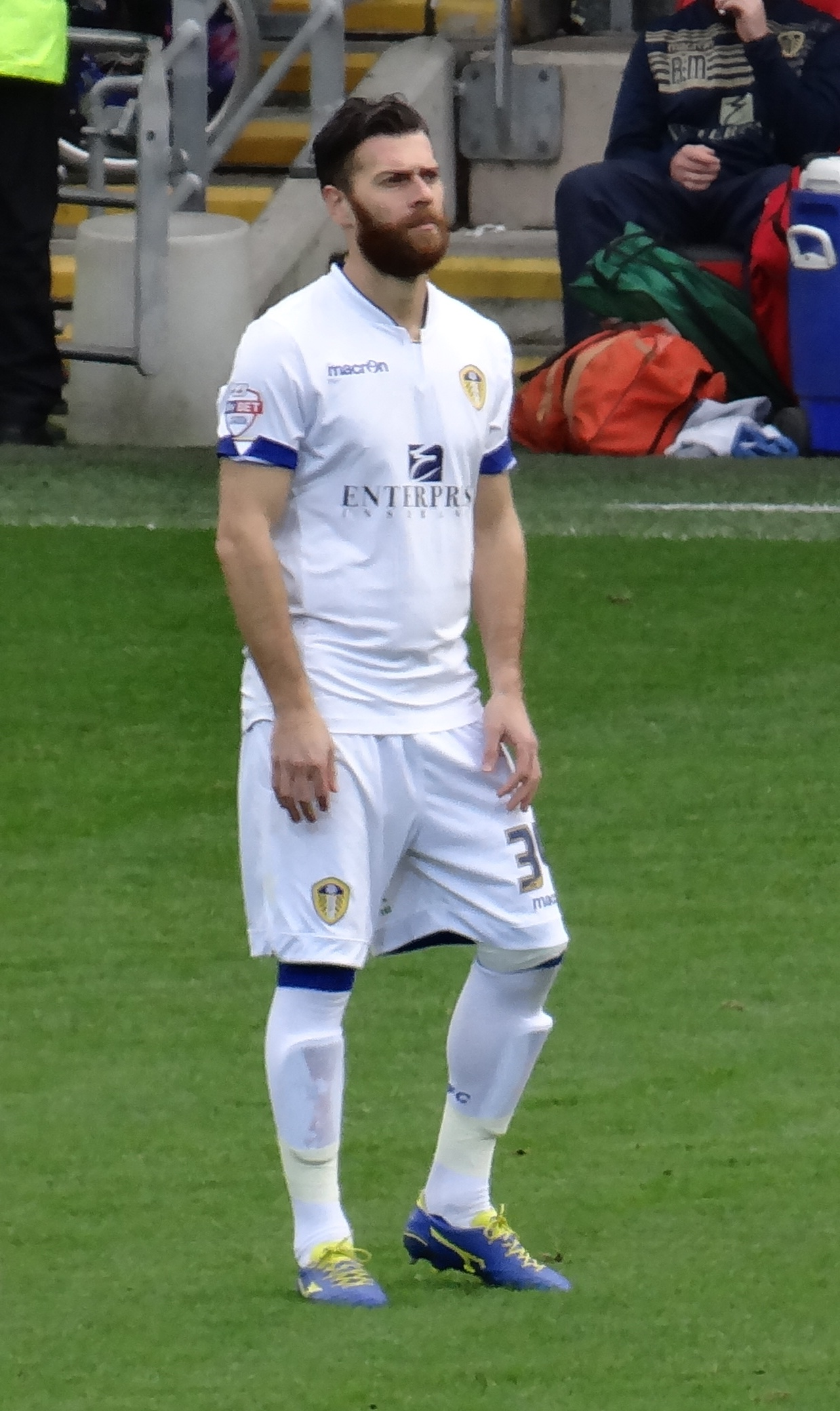
Antennucci playing for Leeds United in 2014.

On 19 August 2014, it was reported that Leeds United had agreed a deal with the Ternana first-team captain to join the club. It was confirmed on 20 August 2014 via the player's own Twitter account that he had joined Leeds. On Saturday 23 August, Antenucci made his Leeds debut against Watford in a 4–1 defeat. Antenucci made his home debut at Elland Road on 30 August against Bolton Wanderers. On 16 September 2014, he scored his first league goal for Leeds against Bournemouth in a 3–1 win. Antenucci finished the 2014–15 season as top scorer for Leeds with 10 league goals. On 2 July 2015, Antenucci's agent Silvio Pagliari revealed that Antenucci and Giuseppe Bellusci would be staying at Leeds and that owner Massimo Cellino said both players were going to be important players for the 2015–16 season.

==== 2015–16 season ====
On 31 July 2015, Antenucci was given his favoured squad number 7 for the upcoming 2015–16 season. On 8 August 2015, on the opening day of the Championship season, Antenucci started the game on the bench against Burnley but came on a substitute and scored a stunning left footed strike to put Leeds 1–0 up in a match that finished as a 1–1 draw. On 12 August 2015, Antenucci scored a penalty in a penalty shootout against Doncaster Rovers in the League Cup, with Leeds losing 4–2 on penalties after a 1–1 draw.

On 19 April, Antenucci was nominated for the Leeds United player of the year award, alongside Charlie Taylor, Liam Bridcutt, Gaetano Berardi and Lewis Cook. The award was won by Taylor on 30 April. Antenucci finished the 2015–16 season as Leeds' second top goal scorer with 9 goals behind Chris Wood who scored 13.

On 7 May 2016, Antenucci revealed in a post on his official Instagram account that he would be leaving Leeds.

=== SPAL ===
On 30 June 2016, Antenucci joined Serie B side SPAL on a free transfer from Leeds. On 15 August 2016, Antenucci scored on his debut for SPAL against Cagliari in a 5–1 defeat in the Coppa Italia Cup.

He scored 18 goals in his first season at the club and finished the third top scorer in Serie B behind top scorer Giampaolo Pazzini (23 goals) and runner up Fabio Ceravolo (21 goals). His goals proved to be crucial as SPAL gained promotion to Serie A for the first time in 49 years by winning Serie B despite only being promoted to Serie B for the first time since 1992–93.

During the 2017–18 season in Serie A he scored 11 times in 33 games, to help the club successfully retain their status in Serie A. The following season ended in similar fashion, with SPAL successfully avoiding relegation and Antenucci scoring 5 goals in 35 appearances.

=== Bari ===
In July 2019 he moved to Serie C newcomers Bari on a permanent basis. He contributed 15 goals to Bari being promoted to Serie B at the end of the 2021–22 season.

=== Return to SPAL ===
On 13 July 2023, Antenucci returned to SPAL, by now relegated to Serie C, on a two-year contract. He retired from the club and from playing professional football with a final match at SPAL's home ground against Gubbio on 27 April 2025.

== International career ==
In 2002, Antenucci represented Italy U-20 C1 before then representing Italy U-21 C1 Italy Lega Pro in 2003.

In 2005, Antenucci won gold representing Italy, in the 2005 Summer Universiade in Turkey. With Italy winning the Gold medal beating Japan in the Summer Universiade Men's Football final.

== Career statistics ==
As of match played 16 April 2022

Appearances and goals by club, season and competition
Club	Season	League			National cup		League cup		Other		Total	
Club	Season	Division	Apps	Goals	Apps	Goals	Apps	Goals	Apps	Goals	Apps	Goals
Giulianova	2002–03	Serie C1	21	1	0	0	—		—		21	1
Giulianova	2003–04	Serie C1	14	0	0	0	—		—		14	0
Giulianova	2005–06	Serie C1	25	1	0	0	—		—		25	1
Giulianova	2006–07	Serie C1	32	11	0	0	—		—		32	11
Giulianova	Total		92	13	0	0	0	0	0	0	92	13
Ancona (loan)	2004–05	Serie C2	26	2	0	0	—		—		26	2
Catania	2008–09	Serie A	4	0	2	0	—		—		6	0
Catania	2010–11	Serie A	14	1	3	2	—		—		17	3
Catania	Total		18	1	5	2	0	0	0	0	23	3
Venezia (loan)	2007–08	Serie C1	27	6	0	0	—		—		27	6
Pisa (loan)	2008–09	Serie B	20	1	0	0	—		—		20	1
Ascoli (loan)	2009–10	Serie B	40	24	1	0	—		—		41	24
Torino	2010–11	Serie B	19	6	0	0	—		—		19	6
Torino	2011–12	Serie B	41	10	2	1	—		—		43	11
Torino	Total		60	16	2	1	0	0	0	0	62	17
Catania	2012–13	Serie A	1	0	0	0	—		—		1	0
Spezia (loan)	2012–13	Serie B	33	6	0	0	—		—		33	6
Ternana	2013–14	Serie B	40	19	1	0	—		—		41	19
Ternana	2014–15	Serie B	0	0	1	0	—		—		1	0
Ternana	Total		40	19	2	0	0	0	0	0	42	19
Leeds	2014–15	Championship	36	10	1	0	—		—		37	10
Leeds	2015–16	Championship	39	9	3	0	1	0	—		43	9
Leeds	Total		75	19	4	0	1	0	0	0	80	19
SPAL	2016–17	Serie B	37	18	2	2	—		—		39	20
SPAL	2017–18	Serie A	33	11	1	0	—		—		34	11
SPAL	2018–19	Serie A	35	5	1	0	—		—		36	5
SPAL	Total		105	34	4	2	0	0	0	0	109	36
Bari	2019–20	Serie C	29	20	0	0	—		3 (Note: Appearance(s) in Promotion Playoffs)	1	34	23
Bari	2020–21	Serie C	31	14	2	1	—		3	0	21	13
Bari	2021–22	Serie C	34	17	—		—		—		21	13
Bari	Total		94	51	2	1	0	0	6	1	102	53
Career total			631	192	20	6	1	0	6	1	658	199

== Honours ==
SPAL

- Serie B: 2016–17

Bari

- Serie C: 2021–22 (Group C)
