= Lewis Cook (footballer, born 1997) =

English footballer (born 1997)

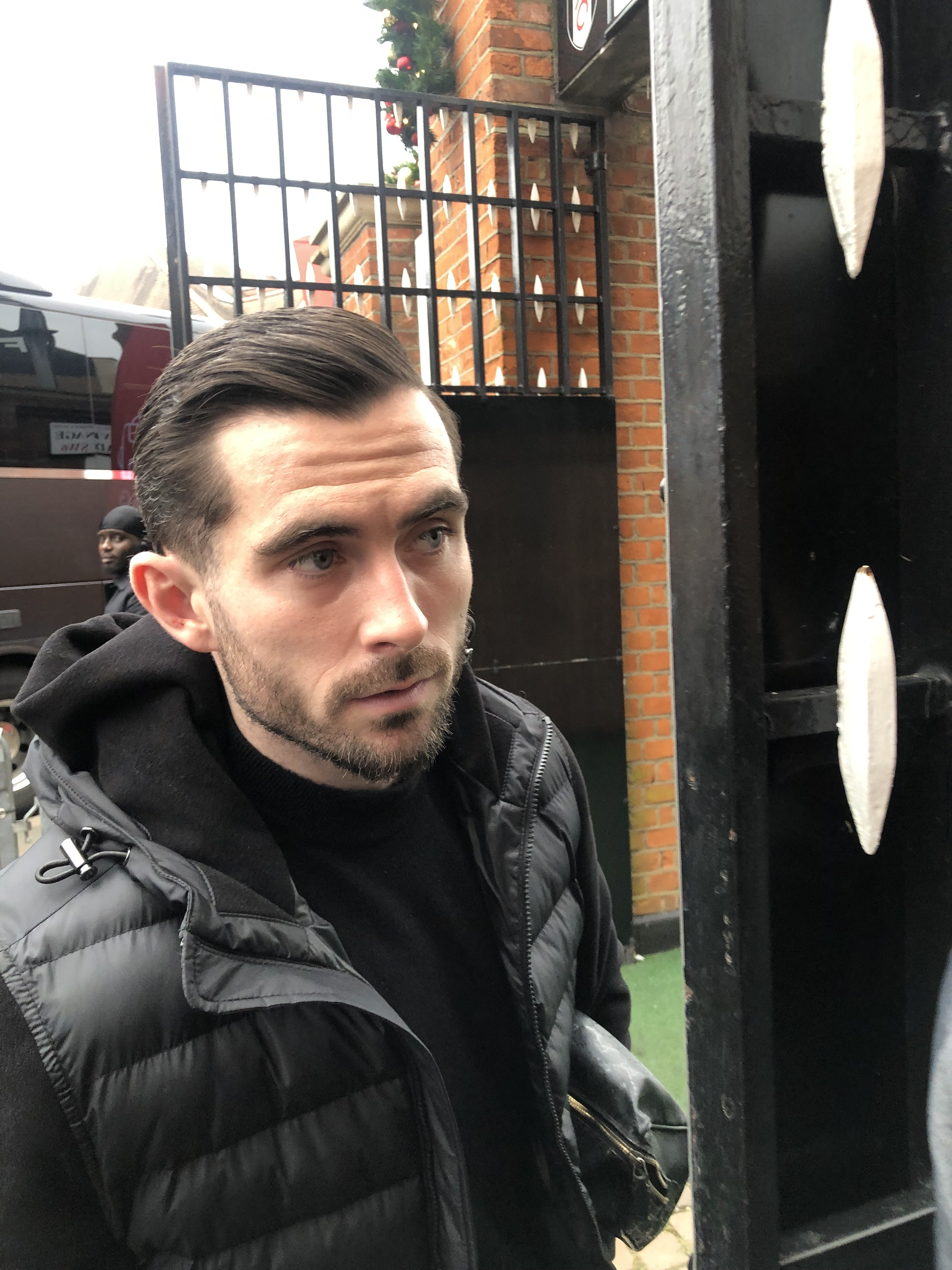
- Cook in 2024

Personal information
- Full name: Lewis John Cook
- Date of birth: 3 February 1997 (age 29)
- Place of birth: York, England
- Height: 5 ft 9 in (1.75 m)
- Position: Defensive midfielder

Team information
- Current team: Bournemouth
- Number: 4

Youth career
- 2004–2014: Leeds United

Senior career*
Years	Team	Apps	(Gls)
2014–2016	Leeds United	80	(1)
2016–	Bournemouth	259	(3)

International career
2011–2013	England U16	5	(0)
2012–2014	England U17	17	(0)
2014	England U18	1	(0)
2015–2016	England U19	8	(0)
2016–2017	England U20	12	(1)
2017–2018	England U21	14	(0)
2018	England	1	(0)
- * Club domestic league appearances and goals as of 23:22, 15 November 2026 (UTC)

Lewis John Cook (born 3 February 1997) is an English professional footballer who plays as a defensive midfielder for Premier League club Bournemouth.

Cook is a graduate of Leeds United's academy. He has represented England at various youth levels. He has won the 2014 UEFA European Under-17 Championship, 2017 FIFA U-20 World Cup and 2018 Toulon Tournament with his country, captaining the team in the latter two tournaments.

== Early life ==
Lewis John Cook was born on 3 February 1997 in York, North Yorkshire, and was raised in the nearby village of Saxton, North Yorkshire. He attended Tadcaster Grammar School, playing for their football teams from under-13 to under-15 level.

== Club career ==
=== Leeds United ===
==== Early career ====
Cook graduated through the Leeds United Academy and was playing for the under-18s team when he was just 15 years old. Cook scored in a 3–1 loss against Liverpool under-18s on 1 March 2013 at Anfield for Leeds under-18s in the FA Youth Cup.

==== 2014–15 season ====
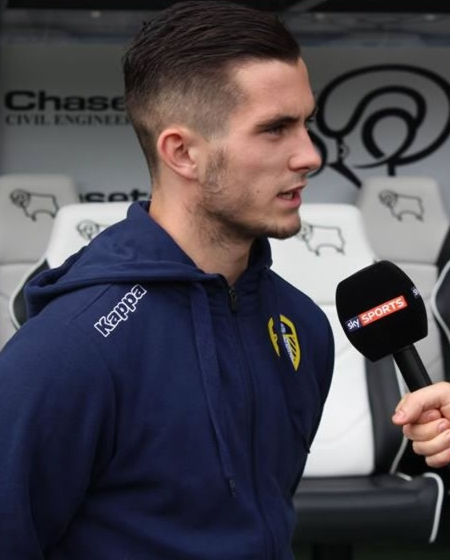
Cook with Leeds United in 2015.

After breaking into the team during the 2014–15 pre-season, Cook made his first-team debut for Leeds United in the first match of the season, coming on as a 64th-minute substitute against Millwall. He made his first start for Leeds on 12 August 2014, starting the League Cup match against Accrington Stanley. He made his first league start on 30 August against Watford. Cook became one of the first names on the teamsheet for Leeds, becoming part of a homegrown contingent in the first team alongside Sam Byram, Alex Mowatt and Charlie Taylor. On 28 March 2015, he picked up an ankle injury on international duty, which ruled him out of the final matches of the season.

On 9 April 2015, after rumoured Premier League interest in Cook and teammates Sam Byram, Alex Mowatt and Charlie Taylor, head coach Neil Redfearn challenged Leeds United's owners to keep a hold of their home-grown talents. On 19 April, Cook won the Championship Apprentice of the Year award for the 2014–15 season. On 1 May 2015, Cook was named as the runner-up to winner Alex Mowatt for the Yorkshire Evening Post Player of the Year for the 2014–15 season. On 2 May 2015, he won Leeds' Young Player of the Year Award and also finished as runner-up to Alex Mowatt in the Fans' Player of the Year Award at the club's official end of season awards ceremony.

==== 2015–16 season ====
Cook signed a new contract at Leeds on 11 May 2015, tying him to the club until June 2017. On 12 August 2015, he scored his first Leeds goal against Doncaster Rovers in the League Cup, but was also sent off in the first half for a straight red card, with Leeds eventually losing 4–2 on penalties after a 1–1 draw. As a result of this red card, Cook received a three-match suspension. After being subject to bids from Premier League clubs, Leeds manager Steve Evans revealed on 7 January 2016 that they had rejected bids for Cook and that club owner Massimo Cellino had assured him that the player would not be sold. On 24 February 2016, Cook scored with a 35-yard shot to earn his first league goal for Leeds in a 1–1 home draw against Fulham.

On 17 April 2016, Cook won the Football League Young Player of the Year Award. At the club's annual Player of the Year Awards ceremony on 30 April 2016, Cook missed out on Player of the Year to Charlie Taylor, but was named the Young Player of the Year for the 2015–16 season. In addition to this, he was presented with the award for Goal of the Season for his goal against Fulham. On 15 June 2016, Leeds owner Massimo Cellino stated he had entered into talks with Cook's agent about extending the player's contract.

=== Bournemouth ===
On 8 July 2016, Cook signed for Premier League club Bournemouth on a four-year contract for an undisclosed fee. He made his debut when starting in a 3–1 defeat at home to Manchester United in their first match of the 2016–17 Premier League. Cook made two further appearances in the League Cup before being sidelined until 2017 by a persistent ankle problem. Cook returned to the first team on 15 April 2017, coming on as a 56th-minute substitute in a 4–0 away defeat to Tottenham Hotspur. He scored his first goal for Bournemouth in a 4–2 win against Reading on 21 November 2020.

On 31 August 2024, and as captain for the first time, Cook scored his first Premier League goal, an equaliser against Everton, in a game that saw Bournemouth complete a comeback win in injury time from 2 goals down.

== International career ==
In May 2014, Cook was part of the England national under-17 team that won the 2014 UEFA European Under-17 Championship, starting three of England's five matches, including the semi-final and the final. In August 2014, he was called up to the under-18 team for a match against the Netherlands.

In March 2015, Cook was called up to Sean O'Driscoll's under-19 team to play Denmark, Azerbaijan and France in the last three remaining European Under-19 Championship qualifiers. He made his debut on 28 March, playing 79 minutes against Azerbaijan in a 1–0 win for England before being replaced by Charlie Colkett. Cook had to withdraw from the squad having suffered an ankle injury against Azerbaijan, meaning he missed the match against France as the team looked to secure a place at the tournament in Greece. He was withdrawn from the squad for the 2016 UEFA European Under-19 Championship by his club manager Garry Monk, who wished to work with the player for a full pre-season.

Cook was selected for the under-20 team for the 2017 FIFA U-20 World Cup and was made captain. He played in six of the seven England matches in the tournament, only being rested for the match against South Korea. He scored a goal in a 1–1 draw against Guinea, his first goal in an international match. England beat Venezuela 1–0 in the final, which was England's first win in a global tournament since their 1966 FIFA World Cup victory, and Cook became the first England captain to lift a world trophy since Bobby Moore.

Cook was called up by the senior team for the first time in November 2017 for a friendly against Brazil. He was again named in the England squad in March 2018 for pre 2018 FIFA World Cup friendlies against the Netherlands and Italy. He made his debut against the latter on 27 March as a 71st-minute substitute in the 1–1 draw at Wembley Stadium.

On 16 May 2018, he was one of five players named on standby for the 23-man England national team squad for the 2018 FIFA World Cup.

Cook received a call up to England U21s by manager Aidy Boothroyd on 18 May 2018, with Cook as Captain for the 2018 Toulon Tournament, with England's group containing fixtures against Qatar, China and Mexico. Cook started in the 2018 Toulon Tournament Final against Mexico on 9 June 2018, captaining England to victory in the tournament with a 2–1 win.

== Career statistics ==
=== Club ===
As of match played 8 November 2026

Appearances and goals by club, season and competition
Club	Season	League			FA Cup		League Cup		Europe		Other		Total	
Club	Season	Division	Apps	Goals	Apps	Goals	Apps	Goals	Apps	Goals	Apps	Goals	Apps	Goals
Leeds United	2014–15	Championship	37	0	0	0	1	0	—		—		38	0
Leeds United	2015–16	Championship	43	1	3	0	1	1	—		—		47	2
Leeds United	Total		80	1	3	0	2	1	—		—		85	2
Bournemouth	2016–17	Premier League	6	0	1	0	2	0	—		—		9	0
Bournemouth	2017–18	Premier League	29	0	0	0	3	0	—		—		32	0
Bournemouth	2018–19	Premier League	13	0	0	0	2	0	—		—		15	0
Bournemouth	2019–20	Premier League	27	0	1	0	1	0	—		—		29	0
Bournemouth	2020–21	Championship	31	1	2	0	2	0	—		0	0	35	1
Bournemouth	2021–22	Championship	28	1	1	0	0	0	—		—		29	1
Bournemouth	2022–23	Premier League	28	0	1	0	2	0	—		—		31	0
Bournemouth	2023–24	Premier League	33	0	3	0	2	0	—		—		38	0
Bournemouth	2024–25	Premier League	36	1	3	0	1	0	—		—		40	1
Bournemouth	2025–26	Premier League	18	0	1	0	0	0	—		—		19	0
Bournemouth	2026–27	Premier League	10	0	0	0	2	1	3 (Note: Appearances in UEFA Europa League)	0	—		15	1
Bournemouth	Total		259	3	13	0	17	1	3	0	0	0	292	4
Career total			339	4	16	0	19	2	2	0	0	0	377	6

=== International ===
Appearances and goals by national team and year
National team	Year	Apps	Goals
England	2018	1	0
Total		1	0

== Honours ==
Bournemouth

- EFL Championship second-place promotion: 2021–22

England U17

- UEFA European Under-17 Championship: 2014

England U20

- FIFA U-20 World Cup: 2017

England U21

- Toulon Tournament: 2018

Individual

- Football League Championship Apprentice of the Year: 2014–15
- Leeds United Young Player of the Year: 2014–15, 2015–16
- Football League Young Player of the Year: 2015–16
- Toulon Tournament Best XI: 2018
