= 2014–15 Leeds United F.C. season =

2014–15 season of Leeds United

Leeds United
2014–15 season
- Chairman: Massimo Cellino (until 23 January); Andrew Umbers (from 23 January)
- Head coach: David Hockaday (until 28 August); Neil Redfearn (caretaker, until 23 Sep); Darko Milanič (until 25 October); Neil Redfearn (until 30 June)
- Stadium: Elland Road
- Championship: 15th
- FA Cup: Third round
- League Cup: Second round
- Top goalscorer: League: Mirco Antenucci (10); All: Mirco Antenucci (10)
- Highest home attendance: 31,850 vs Rotherham United (2 May 2015, Championship)
- Lowest home attendance: 13,407 vs Accrington Stanley (12 August 2014, League Cup)
- Average home league attendance: 24,276
Home colours	Away colours

The 2014–15 season saw Leeds United competing in the Championship (known as the Sky Bet Championship for sponsorship reasons) for a fifth successive season.

A summer that saw the departure of manager Brian McDermott in favour of the unheralded David Hockaday (whose only prior managerial experience was with Conference side Forest Green Rovers), as well as a host of players including club captain and top scorer Ross McCormack and dependable striker Matt Smith shipping out of Elland Road, saw Leeds listed as second-favourites for relegation (ahead of only a Blackpool side who were somehow in even more turmoil both on the pitch and off it) among most bookmakers. Their start to the season did little to dispel these predictions, with Hockaday sacked the day after a humiliating League Cup exit to West Yorkshire rivals Bradford City, on top of losing three of his first four league matches in charge. Sporting journalists were quick to note that his six competitive matches in charge were two fewer than Brian Clough had managed during his infamous 44-day spell as manager.

Academy manager Neil Redfearn took over as caretaker manager and earned 10 points from the next four games, putting Leeds in mid-table, but was overlooked for the permanent manager's job in favour of another unexpected candidate, Slovenian manager Darko Milanič. Milanič failed to win any of his six games in charge, however, and was himself sacked 32 days later, exceeding both Clough's and Jock Stein's joint-record as the club's shortest-serving manager.

With Leeds right back in relegation trouble, they turned once again to Redfearn, and while they remained dangerously close to the foot of the table until well into the New Year, a strong run of form between late January and the end of March propelled them out of danger (as with the previous season, they were also helped by the poor form of all the bottom three clubs). However, the sudden suspension of Redfearn's assistant, Steve Thompson coincided with a poor end to the season and contributed to Redfearn's falling out with Cellino. After the season ended, Cellino first attempted to demote Redfearn back to his prior role as academy manager, then sacked him altogether, leaving Leeds looking for their sixth manager since the departure of Simon Grayson three years prior.

== Background and club ownership ==
On 12 April 2013, Brian McDermott was appointed as Leeds United manager on a three-year contract. In the summer of 2013 McDermott updated the squad with £1 million midfielder Luke Murphy from Crewe Alexandra, and defender Scott Wootton from Manchester United. He further added to this by completing several free transfers including forwards Noel Hunt and Matt Smith in July, and Lithuanian international defender Marius Žaliūkas in late October. However, McDermott stuck with largely the same squad from the previous season. McDermott's side began the season slowly with a succession of draws and losses; however, a surge of form through October to December saw Leeds reach a high of 5th place in the table. By the end of January the club had dropped to 12th in the league however, and were winless in eight matches.

In January 2014 speculation grew that Leeds would be subject to takeover by Italian entrepreneur and Cagliari owner Massimo Cellino. A delegation representing Cellino was seen at Elland Road and the Thorp Arch training ground several times, and on 28 January it was reported that Cellino had asked for his associate and former Middlesbrough defender Gianluca Festa to sit in the dugout for Leeds' 1–1 draw with Ipswich. On 31 January it was reported that McDermott had been sacked as manager of the club, with Gianluca Festa speculated in the media to be his most likely replacement. The following day reports emerged suggesting Gulf Finance House club directors were attempting to reinstate McDermott as manager, saying the Cellino family (the club's prospective new owners) had no authority to dismiss him. In an interview in December 2023, Cellino revealed he had asked for the couch to be replaced rather than the coach and he had been misunderstood. The following day, assistant manager Nigel Gibbs was named as caretaker manager for the club's home derby against Huddersfield Town. Following the game, the club released an official statement saying McDermott had not been dismissed and remained first team manager, and he returned to take first team training on 3 February. On 7 February, it was reported that Cellino had agreed a deal to buy the club subject to approval from the Football League. On 24 March, it was announced that the takeover deal had been vetoed unanimously by the Football League after Cellino was found guilty by Italian courts of failing to pay import duty on a yacht, though the takeover was completed after Cellino successfully appealed this decision. On 7 May, former managing director David Haigh's company, Sport Capital, issued a winding-up petition for a fee owed of around £1m on 7 May. On 10 June, the winding-up petition issued to Leeds by Sport Capital was adjourned but the case remained live and the club were ordered to pay back £958,000 by 23 June. The winding-up petition was dismissed by the High Court when heard on 23 June, resulting in the club's bank account being unfrozen.

== Pre-season events ==
Following the end of the 2013–14 season, in which Leeds eventually finished 15th, manager Brian McDermott left the club by mutual consent. Former Forest Green Rovers manager Dave Hockaday was appointed head as coach of Leeds United on 19 June, with Junior Lewis appointed as his assistant coach. Ahead of the summer transfer window, manager Hockaday claimed that Leeds' squad was too big, claiming "there's excess baggage in every department" that needed to be trimmed, and that he wanted a "tight-knit squad". On 16 May 2014, it was announced that first-team players Jamie Ashdown, Michael Brown, El Hadji Diouf, Adam Drury, Paul Green, Danny Pugh and Luke Varney would not be offered new contracts by the club and were released, as were academy players Simon Lenighan, Nathan Turner, Lewis Turner, Richard Bryan, Smith Tiesse and Gboly Ariyibi. In addition, defenders Lee Peltier and Marius Žaliūkas both had their contracts terminated in order to sign for Huddersfield Town and Rangers respectively. Forward Ross McCormack, who was the top goalscorer in the 2013–14 Football League Championship with 28 goals, transferred to Fulham for an undisclosed fee, reported to be £11 million by BBC Sport. He had submitted a transfer request on 20 June and did not travel for the club's pre-season training camp in Italy, and though owner Cellino initially claimed he was not for sale, he said he was "disrespected" by McCormack and he "had no choice" but to sell him, whilst McCormack claimed he was "hung out to dry" over the transfer. Leeds were later charged with misconduct by The Football Association over the transfer for breaching the FA's football agent regulations over an illegal payment to McCormack's agent Derek Day, and Cellino was banned for 18 months in December 2016.

Cameron Stewart, who had joined the club on an emergency loan from Hull City in January 2013, had agreed to sign permanently for the club at the end of his Hull contract, but this transfer was cancelled by Leeds and he signed for Ipswich Town instead. Stewart's contract agreement with Leeds was not accepted by the Football League as it was signed by former managing director David Haigh, who had been removed from the club's "authorised signautures" list after a dispute with new owner Cellino, and Cellino claimed the contract was invalid rather than re-signing it himself. Stewart later lodged a compensation claim against Leeds United, which he won in May 2015, with Leeds ordered to pay Stewart around £800,000. This compensation was unpaid until the club was threatened with a transfer embargo in July 2015.

Hockaday confirmed on 26 June that the club was currently under a transfer embargo, though the embargo was lifted shortly after as Leeds signed goalkeepers Stuart Taylor (on a free transfer) and Marco Silvestri (for an undisclosed fee from AC ChievoVerona), as the first two transfers of the summer transfer window. Midfielder Tommaso Bianchi and forward Souleymane Doukara both joined from Italian clubs on 12 July; Bianchi was signed for an undisclosed fee from Sassuolo whilst Doukara joined from Catania on a season-long loan, though Doukara was later transferred permanently for an undisclosed fee on 1 September. On 19 July 2014, Swiss defender Gaetano Berardi joined for an undisclosed fee from UC Sampdoria, and signed a two-year contract with the club. Young Slovenian midfielder Žan Benedičič joined on a season-long loan on 4 August, and on the following day, striker Nicky Ajose joined from Peterborough United for an undisclosed fee.

=== Pre-season friendlies ===
Pre season games against Guiseley and Chesterfield were confirmed by the club on 27 June.
A pre season game against Glenavon was confirmed by the club on 29 June. The Glevavon game forms part of the contract that saw Robbie McDaid sign for United in March. The club also confirmed a Leeds XI will face Corby Town.
Two pre season games in Italy were confirmed on 2 July, against local team FC Gherdëina and Romanian team FC Viitorul Constanța. However, the Viitorul Constanța was called off after the Romanian side failed to show up.
A pre season game against Swindon Town was confirmed on 7 July.
A pre season game against Mansfield Town was confirmed on 8 July, whilst the Glenavon game was confirmed as being for a Leeds XI.
The club confirmed a home game against Dundee United will complete the team's pre season schedule on 9 July.

10 July 2014	Gherdëina	0–16	Leeds United	Val Gardena, Italy
16:30 BST		Report	Hunt 18', 19', 28' (pen.); Morison 29', 41'; Walters 40'; Norris 45'; Smith 54', 55', 58', 74', 83', 85'; Murphy 67'; Poleon 79', 82'	Stadium: Mulin De Coi; Attendance: ~100

19 July 2014	Guiseley	0–2	Leeds United	Guiseley
15:00 BST		Report	Pearce 85'; Smith 90'	Stadium: Nethermoor Park; Attendance: 2,200; Referee: Adrian Holmes

22 July 2014	Mansfield Town	2–0	Leeds United	Mansfield
19:45 BST	Hearn 72' (pen.), 83'	Report		Stadium: Field Mill; Attendance: 3,493; Referee: Gary Sutton

23 July 2014	Corby Town	1–2	Leeds United XI	Corby
19:45 BST	Malone 10'	Report	Parkin 44'; Mbanje 57'	Stadium: Steel Park; Attendance: 732; Referee: Ellis Clarke

26 July 2014	Chesterfield	2–2	Leeds United	Chesterfield
15:00 BST	Morsy 55', 66'	Report	Austin 47' (pen.), 87' (pen.)	Stadium: Proact Stadium; Attendance: 4,048; Referee: Michael Naylor

29 July 2014	Swindon Town	1–2	Leeds United	Swindon
19:45 BST	Smith 31'	Report	Morison 15'; Austin 47' (pen.)	Stadium: County Ground; Attendance: 3,769; Referee: Simon Hooper

30 July 2014	Glenavon	0–5	Leeds United XI	Lurgan, Northern Ireland
19:45 BST		Report	Dawson 19', 47', 64' (pen.); Smith 79'; Stokes 81'	Stadium: Mourneview Park

2 August 2014	Leeds United	2–0	Dundee United	Leeds
15:00 BST	Morison 3'; Poleon 86'	Report		Stadium: Elland Road; Attendance: 10,150; Referee: Andy Madeley

== Review ==
=== July ===
- 1 July: Transfer embargo is lifted days after club's bank account is unfrozen

=== August ===
- 28 August: David Hockaday and Junior Lewis's contract as head coach and assistant coach are terminated with immediate effect, with Neil Redfearn taking over as caretaker head coach.

=== September ===
- 23 September: Darko Milanič announced as the new head coach after signing a two-year contract, with Neil Redfearn returning to his role of Academy manager and head of coaching, and Novica Nikčević joining as assistant coach.
- 26 September: Consultant Graham Bean is sacked over a fixture dispute, relating to the rearrangement of the home fixture vs. Reading.

=== October ===
- 25 October: The club part company with Darko Milanič, after failing to win in six games.

=== November ===
- 1 November: Academy manager Neil Redfearn is appointed as head coach on a one-year rolling contract, with the contract including the option to return to the club's Academy.
- 7 November: Leeds United have been served with a winding-up petition by law firm Ford & Warren Solicitors over unpaid fees of £150,000, that date back to when Ken Bates owned the club. The club issued a statement confirming the receiving of the winding-up petition. However, due to the illegal the winding-up order to the media within seven days of its service, the club's lawyers demanded that the petition be immediately withdrawn, and a full apology made else the club will ask the court to dismiss the petition on Monday morning.
- 12 November: The winding up petition presented by Melvyn Levi is dismissed on agreed terms.
- 27 November: Companies House confirm that David Haigh and Salah Nooruddin have resigned from Leeds United’s board – several months after the two men actually quit as directors. Salem Patel remains as a director and GFH revealed that Jinesh Patel, the CEO of Dubai-based GFH Capital, joined him on the Leeds’ board earlier this year.

=== December ===
- 1 December: The Football League disqualify Massimo Cellino from being a director of Leeds United Football Club until 18 March 2015.
- 4 December: Massimo Cellino and GFH Capital signed an agreement on 1 December to inject up to a further £20m of equity capital into the club.
- 12 December: Matt Child is appointed as the club's new Chief Operating Officer.
- 15 December: An initial analysis of the Championship Financial Fair Play for the Season 2013/14 Submissions indicated that Leeds United, Nottingham Forest and Blackburn Rovers failed to meet the Fair Play Requirement under the division’s Financial Fair Play rules. Consequently, all three were subject to an ‘FFP embargo’ under Football League regulations from 1 January 2015 for the remainder of the 2014/15 campaign.
- 18 December: Steve Thompson appointed assistant coach, arriving from Huddersfield Town.
- 22 December: Giuseppe Bellusci is charged by the FA for misconduct for a breach of FA Rule E3 for an incident alleged to have occurred during the fixture between Norwich City and Leeds United on 21 October 2014. It is alleged Bellusci used abusive and/or insulting words towards Cameron Jerome, of Norwich City, contrary to Rule E3(1). It is further alleged that this breach of Rule E3(1) is an "Aggravated Breach" as defined in Rule E3(2), as it included a reference to ethnic origin and/or colour and/or race. Bellusci has until 2 January 2014 to respond. there Due to there being no third party evidence supporting Jerome’s allegation, Bellusci will be contesting the charge.
- 23 December: The Football League and the legal representatives of Leeds United President Massimo Cellino have agreed the process and date of Mr. Cellino’s appeal against the decision by The Football League Board that he is subject to a disqualifying condition under its Owners’ and Directors’ Test, with it being heard by a Professional Conduct Committee chaired by Tim Kerr QC on 15 January. The original decision required Mr. Cellino to resign as a director of Leeds United and cease acting as a ‘relevant person’ in line with Football League regulations by 29 December. The League has agreed to defer that deadline until two days after the handing down of the final decision of the PCC. As a consequence, the parties have agreed that if Mr Cellino is unsuccessful in his appeal, any disqualification period will be extended by an amount equivalent to the length of time between 29 December and the deferred deadline.
- 31 December: Financier Andrew Umbers joins the board as a club director.

=== January ===
- 19 January: A Professional Conduct Committee (PCC) chaired by Tim Kerr QC rejected an appeal by Leeds United President Massimo Cellino against the decision by the Board of The Football League that he is subject to a disqualifying condition under its Owners' and Directors' Test. The PCC found that the reasoned judgment of the Italian Court, once it had become available, was for an act involving dishonesty as determined by the Board in its original ruling in March 2014. As a result of this decision, Massimo Cellino is disqualified from acting as a ‘Relevant Person’, as defined by Football League regulations until 10 April 2015.
- 23 January: Massimo Cellino has resigned from his post at Leeds United, abiding by the Football League's ruling, with the plan of returning to his position in April. Board director Andrew Umbers is appointed interim Leeds United chairman in the absence of Massimo Cellino.

=== February ===
- 6 February: Giuseppe Bellusci is cleared of all charges of racism made against him during the away game against Norwich City on 21 October 2014, by the FA disciplinary panel.
- 24 February: Club president Massimo Cellino announces he will not return to the club when his Football League ban ends in April in order to clear his name as an independent citizen. Cellino intends to appeal against the legality of his ban through arbitration with the FA (rule K). Cellino also disclosed that he has sold a minority stake to an unnamed buyer in order to comply with his Football League ban.

=== March ===
- 5 March: The Football League, Leeds United and Massimo Cellino settled the outstanding disciplinary proceedings relating to the club's non disclosure of the Italian Court's judgement regarding Cellino as required under League regulations. As a result, Cellino's period of disqualification as a 'relevant person', as defined by the regulations, has been extended from 10 April until 3 May.
- 23 March: Matt Child resigns as Chief Operating Officer at Leeds United.

=== April ===
- 2 April: Director of Football, Nicola Salerno, suspends assistant coach Steve Thompson from his duties at the club, over an internal issue.
- 19 April: Lewis Cook crowned the Sky Bet Championship’s LFE Apprentice of the Year 2014/15.

== Competitions ==
=== Overall summary ===
Competition	Started round	Final position / round	First match	Last match
2014–15 Championship	—	15th	9 August 2014	2 May 2015
League Cup	First round	Second round	12 August 2014	27 August 2014
FA Cup	Third round	Third round	4 January 2015	4 January 2015

Updated to match played 2 May 2015
Source: Competitions

=== Championship ===
==== League table ====
Pos	Team	Pld	W	D	L	GF	GA	GD	Pts
13	Sheffield Wednesday	46	14	18	14	43	49	−6	60
14	Nottingham Forest	46	15	14	17	71	69	+2	59
15	Leeds United	46	15	11	20	50	61	−11	56
16	Huddersfield Town	46	13	16	17	58	75	−17	55
17	Fulham	46	14	10	22	62	83	−21	52

Updated to match(es) played on 2 May 2015. Source: Sky Sports
Rules for classification: 1) Points; 2) Goal difference; 3) Number of goals scored

==== Results summary ====
Overall								Home						Away					
Pld	W	D	L	GF	GA	GD	Pts	W	D	L	GF	GA	GD	W	D	L	GF	GA	GD
46	15	11	20	47	63	−16	56	8	6	9	22	24	−2	7	5	11	25	39	−14

Last updated: 2 May 2015.
Source: The Football League

==== Results by matchday ====
Matchday	1	2	3	4	5	6	7	8	9	10	11	12	13	14	15	16	17	18	19	20	21	22	23	24	25	26	27	28	29	30	31	32	33	34	35	36	37	38	39	40	41	42	43	44	45	46
Ground	A	H	H	A	H	A	A	H	A	H	H	A	A	H	A	H	H	A	H	A	H	A	H	A	A	H	H	A	H	A	H	A	A	H	H	A	H	A	A	H	A	H	H	A	A	H
Result	L	W	L	L	W	D	W	W	L	D	D	L	D	L	L	D	W	L	W	L	L	D	L	L	D	D	W	W	L	W	W	W	L	L	W	W	D	W	D	L	L	L	L	L	W	D
Position	22	17	19	21	18	19	13	11	13	12	11	14	15	18	19	17	15	16	15	16	19	18	20	20	21	20	19	17	20	17	12	11	14	16	15	13	13	12	13	14	14	15	15	16	15	15

Updated to match(es) played on 2 May 2015. Source: Competitive Matches
A = Away; H = Home; W = Win; D = Draw; L = Loss

==== Matches ====
On 18 June, the Championship fixtures were released.

9 August 2014 1	Millwall	2–0	Leeds United	South Bermondsey
15:00 BST	Beevers 8'; Williams 88' (pen.)	Report		Stadium: The Den; Attendance: 16,205 (2,171 away); Referee: Oliver Langford

16 August 2014 2	Leeds United	1–0	Middlesbrough	Leeds
12:15 BST	Sharp 88' (yellow card) 89'	Report	Ayala (yellow card) 28'; Leadbitter (yellow card) 77'; Friend (yellow card) 78'	Stadium: Elland Road; Attendance: 24,484; Referee: Stuart Attwell

19 August 2014 3	Leeds United	0–2	Brighton & Hove Albion	Leeds
19:45 BST	Austin (yellow card) 3'; Warnock (yellow card) 5'; Murphy (yellow card) 50'; Byram (yellow card) 67'; Pearce (yellow card) 82'	Report	Teixeira 5'; LuaLua 83'; Holla (yellow card) 37'	Stadium: Elland Road; Attendance: 21,429; Referee: James Adcock

23 August 2014 4	Watford	4–1	Leeds United	Watford
15:00 BST	Forestieri 20', 67'; Deeney 58' (pen.); Tőzsér 90+1' (yellow card) 42'; Angella (yellow card) 47'	Report	Tamaș 32' (o.g.); Bellusci (red card) 56'; Murphy (yellow card) 85'; Austin (yellow card) 90'; Byram (red card) 90+2'	Stadium: Vicarage Road; Attendance: 15,674 (1,975 away); Referee: James Linington

30 August 2014 5	Leeds United	1–0	Bolton Wanderers	Leeds
15:00 BST	Warnock 17'; Wootton (yellow card) 42'; Pearce (yellow card) 58'	Report		Stadium: Elland Road; Attendance: 21,901; Referee: Simon Hooper

13 September 2014 6	Birmingham City	1–1	Leeds United	Birmingham
12:15 BST	Thomas 37' (yellow card) 82'; Gray (yellow card) 87'	Report	Mowatt 76'	Stadium: St Andrew's; Attendance: 15,266 (2,654 away); Referee: Scott Duncan

16 September 2014 7	Bournemouth	1–3	Leeds United	Bournemouth
19:45 BST	Surman 6'; Arter (yellow card) 84'	Report	Doukara 67'; Bellusci 82' (yellow card) 80'; Antenucci 90'	Stadium: Dean Court; Attendance: 9,307 (1,390 away); Referee: Brendan Malone

20 September 2014 8	Leeds United	3–0	Huddersfield Town	Leeds
15:00 BST	Austin 19'; Antenucci 45+1'; Doukara 69' (yellow card) 70'; Berardi (red card) 73'; Bellusci (yellow card) 25'	Report	Lynch (yellow card) 90'	Stadium: Elland Road; Attendance: 29,131; Referee: Chris Foy

27 September 2014 9	Brentford	2–0	Leeds United	Brentford
15:00 BST	Tarkowski (penalty missed) 28'; Jota 45+1'; McCormack 77'	Report	Pearce (yellow card) 27'	Stadium: Griffin Park; Attendance: 10,886 (1,620 away); Referee: Dean Whitestone

1 October 2014 10	Leeds United	0–0	Reading	Leeds
19:45 BST	Cooper (yellow card) 64'; Bellusci (yellow card) 66'; Doukara (yellow card) 70'	Report	Hector (yellow card) 19'; Norwood (yellow card) 80'; Pearce (yellow card) 90'	Stadium: Elland Road; Attendance: 20,705; Referee: Tony Harrington

4 October 2014 11	Leeds United	1–1	Sheffield Wednesday	Leeds
12:15 BST	Bellusci 79' (yellow card) 67'; Berardi (yellow card) 66'; Byram (yellow card) 71'	Report	Maguire 52' (yellow card) 66'; Nuhiu (yellow card) 41'; Lee (yellow card) 72'; Semedo (yellow card) 77'	Stadium: Elland Road; Attendance: 24,094; Referee: James Adcock

17 October 2014 12	Rotherham United	2–1	Leeds United	Rotherham
19:45 BST	Revell 57' (yellow card) 73'; Clarke-Harris 65' (yellow card) 90'; Frecklington (yellow card) 29'	Report	Antenucci 30'; Bianchi (yellow card) 51'; Silvestri (yellow card) 73'; Doukara (yellow card) 76'; Adryan (yellow card) 90+3'	Stadium: New York Stadium; Attendance: 11,350 (2,294 away); Referee: Keith Stroud

21 October 2014 13	Norwich City	1–1	Leeds United	Norwich
19:45 BST	Martin 59'; Jerome (yellow card) 26'; Lafferty (yellow card) 66'	Report	Doukara 63' (yellow card) 72'; Austin (yellow card) 44'	Stadium: Carrow Road; Attendance: 26,565 (1,791 away); Referee: Mark Clattenburg

25 October 2014 14	Leeds United	1–2	Wolverhampton Wanderers	Leeds
15:00 BST	Antenucci 18'	Report	Henry 66'; Clarke 85'; Evans (yellow card) 76'	Stadium: Elland Road; Attendance: 27,883 (2,074 away); Referee: David Webb

1 November 2014 15	Cardiff City	3–1	Leeds United	Cardiff, Wales
15:00 GMT	Manga 60'; Macheda 67'; Jones 83' (yellow card) 84'; Ralls (yellow card) 51'	Report	Mowatt 77' (yellow card) 49'; Pearce (yellow card) 10'; Berardi (yellow card) 27'	Stadium: Cardiff City Stadium; Attendance: 24,220 (2,148 away); Referee: Andy Woolmer

4 November 2014 16	Leeds United	2–2	Charlton Athletic	Leeds
19:45 GMT	Mowatt 49', 67'; Bianchi (yellow card) 60'; Bellusci (yellow card) 80'	Report	Berg Guðmundsson 62', 81' (pen.); Buyens (yellow card) 29'; Cousins (yellow card) 48'	Stadium: Elland Road; Attendance: 18,698; Referee: Graham Salisbury

8 November 2014 17	Leeds United	3–1	Blackpool	Leeds
15:00 GMT	Cooper 9'; Doukara 31'; Antenucci 42'; Cook (yellow card) 81'	Report	Ranger 75'	Stadium: Elland Road; Attendance: 23,846; Referee: Stuart Attwell

22 November 2014 18	Blackburn Rovers	2–1	Leeds United	Blackburn
15:00 GMT	Rhodes 71', 88' (pen.); Cairney (red card) 82'; Duffy (yellow card) 44'	Report	Doukara 33'; Adryan (yellow card) 28'; Warnock (yellow card) 90+6'	Stadium: Ewood Park; Attendance: 21,432 (6,839 away); Referee: Kevin Wright

29 November 2014 19	Leeds United	2–0	Derby County	Leeds
15:00 GMT	Antenucci 43', 50'; Bianchi (yellow card) 14'; Doukara (yellow card) 22'; Cooper (yellow card) 27'; Bellusci (yellow card) 75'	Report	Christie (yellow card) 17'; Mascarell (yellow card) 35'; Martin (yellow card) 54'; Russell (yellow card) 63'; Shotton (yellow card) 89'	Stadium: Elland Road; Attendance: 26,028; Referee: Mick Russell

6 December 2014 20	Ipswich Town	4–1	Leeds United	Ipswich
15:00 GMT	Murphy 12', 45+1'; McGoldrick 26' (pen.); Smith 48' (yellow card) 54'; Tabb (yellow card) 40'	Report	Antenucci 4'; Bianchi (yellow card) 61'; Cook (yellow card) 88'	Stadium: Portman Road; Attendance: 21,489 (1,835 away); Referee: Mike Dean

13 December 2014 21	Leeds United	0–1	Fulham	Leeds
15:00 GMT	Mowatt (yellow card) 68'	Report	Rodallega 60'	Stadium: Elland Road; Attendance: 27,264; Referee: Scott Duncan

20 December 2014 22	Nottingham Forest	1–1	Leeds United	Nottingham
17:15 GMT	Fryatt 45+1'; Mancienne (yellow card) 23'; Antonio (yellow card) 73'; Lichaj (yellow card) 82'	Report	Sharp 54' (pen.); Byram (yellow card) 24'	Stadium: City Ground; Attendance: 22,664 (1,850 away); Referee: Roger East

26 December 2014 23	Leeds United	0–2	Wigan Athletic	Leeds
15:00 GMT	Bellusci (yellow card) 85'	Report	Cooper 11' (o.g.); McClean 83' (yellow card) 85'	Stadium: Elland Road; Attendance: 28,375; Referee: Nigel Miller

30 December 2014 24	Derby County	2–0	Leeds United	Derby
19:45 GMT	Mowatt 41' (o.g.); Buxton 47'; Hendrick (yellow card) 1'	Report	Mowatt (yellow card) 31'; Cooper (yellow card) 50'; Bellusci (yellow card) 88'; Austin (yellow card) 90+3'	Stadium: Pride Park; Attendance: 31,690 (2,236 away); Referee: Keith Stroud

10 January 2015 25	Bolton Wanderers	1–1	Leeds United	Horwich
15:00 GMT	Guðjohnsen 48' (pen.); Trotter (yellow card) 14'; Danns (yellow card) 90+1'	Report	Austin 3' (pen.); Bellusci (yellow card) 45+1'	Stadium: Macron Stadium; Attendance: 18,844 (3,918 away); Referee: Andy Woolmer

17 January 2015 26	Leeds United	1–1	Birmingham City	Leeds
15:00 GMT	Murphy 86'; Antenucci (yellow card) 44'	Report	Caddis 8' (pen.); Robinson (yellow card) 44'; Shinnie (yellow card) 60'; Žigić (yellow card) 90+3'	Stadium: Elland Road; Attendance: 23,534 (1,136 away); Referee: Dean Whitestone

20 January 2015 27	Leeds United	1–0	Bournemouth	Leeds
19:45 GMT	Murphy 36'; Cook (yellow card) 15'; Byram (yellow card) 84'; Bellusci (red card) 86'	Report	Francis (yellow card) 47'; Kermorgant (penalty missed) 87'	Stadium: Elland Road; Attendance: 17,634; Referee: Oliver Langford

31 January 2015 28	Huddersfield Town	1–2	Leeds United	Huddersfield
12:30 GMT	Bunn 26'; Butterfield (yellow card) 41'; Lynch (yellow card) 45'	Report	Byram 7'; Sharp 90' (yellow card) 90'; C.Taylor (yellow card) 35'; Austin (yellow card) 45'	Stadium: John Smith's Stadium; Attendance: 20,029 (3,976 away); Referee: Chris Foy

7 February 2015 29	Leeds United	0–1	Brentford	Leeds
15:00 GMT	Cooper (yellow card) 24'; Austin (yellow card) 70'; Cook (yellow card) 87'	Report	Pritchard 65'; Dean (yellow card) 11'; Bidwell (yellow card) 82'; Toral (yellow card) 90'	Stadium: Elland Road; Attendance: 23,164; Referee: Graham Salisbury

10 February 2015 30	Reading	0–2	Leeds United	Reading
20:00 GMT		Report	Murphy 63'; Byram 90' (yellow card) 90+1'; Wootton (yellow card) 59'	Stadium: Madejski Stadium; Attendance: 18,124 (2,602 away); Referee: Graham Scott

14 February 2015 31	Leeds United	1–0	Millwall	Leeds
15:00 GMT	Mowatt 39' (yellow card) 76'; Austin (yellow card) 45'; Cook (yellow card) 84'	Report	Maierhofer (yellow card) 35'; Ángel (yellow card) 47'	Stadium: Elland Road; Attendance: 24,000; Referee: Paul Tierney

21 February 2015 32	Middlesbrough	0–1	Leeds United	Middlesbrough
12:15 GMT	Forshaw (yellow card) 80'	Report	Mowatt 3'; Bellusci (yellow card) 23'; Bamba (yellow card) 57'; Cooper (yellow card) 90+5'	Stadium: Riverside Stadium; Attendance: 25,531 (2,960 away); Referee: Andre Marriner

24 February 2015 33	Brighton & Hove Albion	2–0	Leeds United	Brighton & Hove
19:45 GMT	Baldock 26'; Calderón 63'; Kayal (yellow card) 42'; LuaLua (yellow card) 90'	Report	Austin (yellow card) 85'	Stadium: Falmer Stadium; Attendance: 25,274 (1,815 away); Referee: Fred Graham

28 February 2015 34	Leeds United	2–3	Watford	Leeds
15:00 GMT	Sharp 6'; Austin 19'; Cook (yellow card) 21'	Report	Deeney 39'; Vydra 56', 80'; Watson (yellow card) 48'; Abdi (yellow card) 87'	Stadium: Elland Road; Attendance: 24,705; Referee: Andy Haines

4 March 2015 35	Leeds United	2–1	Ipswich Town	Leeds
19:45 GMT	Mowatt 71'; Sharp 77'	Report	Sears 74'; Murphy (penalty missed) 84'; Bru (yellow card) 66'; Skuse (yellow card) 88'	Stadium: Elland Road; Attendance: 19,730; Referee: Mark Brown

7 March 2015 36	Wigan Athletic	0–1	Leeds United	Wigan
15:00 GMT	Pearce (yellow card) 90+5'	Report	Mowatt 51'; Murphy (yellow card) 39'; Bamba (yellow card) 57'; Sharp (yellow card) 68'; Wootton (yellow card) 86'	Stadium: DW Stadium; Attendance: 16,163 (4,698 away); Referee: Geoff Eltringham

14 March 2015 37	Leeds United	0–0	Nottingham Forest	Leeds
15:00 GMT	Bellusci (yellow card) 50'; Morison (yellow card) 66'; Mowatt (yellow card) 77'; Murphy (yellow card) 85'	Report		Stadium: Elland Road; Attendance: 30,722; Referee: Keith Hill

18 March 2015 38	Fulham	0–3	Leeds United	Fulham
20:00 GMT	Stafylidis (red card)	Report	Byram 40'; Bamba 48' (yellow card) 87'; Antenucci 88'; Sharp (yellow card) 46'	Stadium: Craven Cottage; Attendance: 19,200 (2,968 away); Referee: Chris Kavanagh

21 March 2015 39	Blackpool	1–1	Leeds United	Blackpool
15:00 GMT	Madine 44'; Cubero (yellow card) 61'; Orlandi (yellow card) 90+2'	Report	Antenucci 62'; Byram (yellow card) 66'; Bellusci (yellow card) 90+5'	Stadium: Bloomfield Road; Attendance: 11,688 (1,650 away); Referee: Scott Duncan

4 April 2015 40	Leeds United	0–3	Blackburn Rovers	Leeds
15:00 BST	Austin (red card) 39'; Antenucci (yellow card) 68'; Murphy (yellow card) 84'; C.Taylor (yellow card) 88'	Report	Cairney 62'; Rhodes 69'; Spearing 80'; Henley (yellow card) 55'; P.Taylor (yellow card) 77'	Stadium: Elland Road; Attendance: 25,293; Referee: Gary Sutton

6 April 2015 41	Wolverhampton Wanderers	4–3	Leeds United	Wolverhampton
17:15 BST	Dicko 19', 45+1'; Afobe 48'; Edwards 88'; Golbourne (yellow card) 37'; Batth (yellow card) 39'	Report	C.Taylor 11'; Batth 65' (o.g.); Mowatt 74'; Wootton (yellow card) 8'; Byram (yellow card) 18'; Bamba (yellow card) 55'	Stadium: Molineux; Attendance: 25,169 (2,337 away); Referee: David Coote

11 April 2015 42	Leeds United	1–2	Cardiff City	Leeds
15:00 BST	Phillips 17'; Bellusci (yellow card) 54'; Mowatt (yellow card) 83'	Report	Morrison 14' (yellow card) 45+1'; Gunarsson 62' (yellow card) 55'; Peltier (yellow card) 36'; Harris (yellow card) 85'	Stadium: Elland Road; Attendance: 22,401; Referee: Chris Kavanagh

14 April 2015 43	Leeds United	0–2	Norwich City	Leeds
19:45 BST		Report	Howson 57'; Dorrans (penalty missed) 31' 90+1'; Olsson (yellow card) 25'; Tettey (yellow card) 37'; Whittaker (yellow card) 63'	Stadium: Elland Road; Attendance: 21,471; Referee: Mike Jones

18 April 2015 44	Charlton Athletic	2–1	Leeds United	Charlton
15:00 BST	Watt 75' (yellow card) 76'; Buyens 80' (pen.); Vetokele (yellow card) 59'	Report	Morison 40'; Sharp (penalty missed) 36'	Stadium: The Valley; Attendance: 18,053 (3,140 away); Referee: Tony Harrington

25 April 2015 45	Sheffield Wednesday	1–2	Leeds United	Sheffield
12:30 BST	Maguire 36' (pen.); Hélan (yellow card) 15'; Semedo (yellow card) 60'	Report	C.Taylor 57'; Morison 72'; Bamba (yellow card) 35'; Murphy (yellow card) 69'	Stadium: Hillsborough; Attendance: 28,227 (3,998 away); Referee: Robert Madley

2 May 2015 46	Leeds United	0–0	Rotherham United	Leeds
12:15 BST	Bamba (yellow card) 25'	Report		Stadium: Elland Road; Attendance: 31,850; Referee: Andy D'Urso

=== FA Cup ===
4 January 2015 Third round	Sunderland	1–0	Leeds United	Sunderland
13:00 GMT	van Aanholt 33'; Bridcutt (yellow card) 70'	Report	Murphy (yellow card) 35'	Stadium: Stadium of Light; Attendance: 30,302; Referee: Mike Dean

=== League Cup ===
12 August 2014 First round	Leeds United	2–1	Accrington Stanley	Leeds
19:45 BST	Doukara 20', 37' (yellow card) 51'; Tonge (yellow card) 53'; Pearce (yellow card) 71'; Berardi (red card) 89'	Report	Gray 84'; Winnard (yellow card) 56'; Hunt (yellow card) 74'	Stadium: Elland Road; Attendance: 13,407; Referee: Richard Clark

27 August 2014 Second round	Bradford City	2–1	Leeds United	Bradford
19:45 BST	Knott 84'; Hanson 86'; Meredith (yellow card) 90+8'	Report	Smith 82'; Murphy (red card) 30'; Cooper (yellow card) 45+2'	Stadium: Valley Parade; Attendance: 18,750; Referee: Graham Scott

== First-team squad ==
=== Squad information ===
N	Pos.	Nat.	Name	Age	Since	App	Goals	Ends	Transfer fee	Notes
1	GK	(Italy)	Marco Silvestri	24	2014	44	0	2018	£450,000	
2	DF	(England)	Sam Byram	21	2012	119	7	2016	Youth system	
3	DF	(Ivory Coast) (France)	Sol Bamba	30	2015 (Winter)	19	1	2015	Loan	On loan from Palermo
4	MF	(Jamaica)	Rodolph Austin	29	2012	112	10	2015	£300,000	
5	DF	(Italy)	Giuseppe Bellusci	25	2014	30	2	2018	£1,600,000	
6	MF	(France) (Democratic Republic of the Congo)	Granddi Ngoyi	26	2015 (Winter)	1	0	2015	Loan	On loan from Palermo
7	MF	(England)	Luke Murphy	25	2013	72	6	2016	£1,000,000	
8	FW	(England)	Billy Sharp	29	2014	35	5	2016	£600,000	
9	FW	(Brazil)	Adryan Tavares	20	2014	13	0	2015	Loan	On loan from Flamengo
10	FW	(Albania)	Edgar Çani	25	2015 (Winter)	4	0	2015	Loan	On loan from Catania
11	MF	(Republic of Ireland) (England)	Aidy White	23	2008	111	2	2015	Youth system	
12	DF	(Switzerland)	Gaetano Berardi	26	2014	24	0	2016	£250,000	
13	GK	(England)	Stuart Taylor	34	2014	5	0	2015	Free	
14	MF	(Italy)	Tommaso Bianchi	26	2014	26	0	2018	£500,000	
15	DF	(England)	Scott Wootton	23	2013	48	1	2017	£1,000,000	
16	FW	(Nigeria) (England)	Nicky Ajose	23	2014	4	0	2017	£150,000	On loan to Crewe Alexandra
18	MF	(England)	Michael Tonge	32	2012	76	5	2015	£200,000	On loan to Millwall
19	FW	(Wales) (England)	Steve Morison	31	2013 (Winter)	42	5	2016	PX	
21	DF	(England)	Charlie Taylor	21	2011	29	2	2017	Youth system	
22	MF	(England)	Zac Thompson	22	2011 (Winter)	12	0	2015	Free	
23	MF	(England)	Lewis Cook	18	2014	38	0	2016	Youth system	
24	MF	(Wales) (England)	Chris Dawson	20	2012	4	0	2016	Youth system	
25	DF	(England)	Ross Killock	20	2012	0	0	2016	Youth system	
26	FW	(Paraguay)	Brian Montenegro	21	2014	6	0	2015	Loan	On loan from Nacional
27	MF	(England)	Alex Mowatt	20	2013	69	10	2017	Youth system	
28	FW	(England)	Lewis Walters	20	2013	0	0	2015	Youth system	
29	FW	(Senegal) (France)	Souleymane Doukara	23	2014	27	7	2017	£1,500,000	
30	GK	(England)	Alex Cairns	22	2011	1	0	2015	Youth system	
31	MF	(Slovenia)	Žan Benedičič	19	2014	2	0	2015	Loan	On loan from AC Milan
32	DF	(Scotland) (England)	Liam Cooper	23	2014	31	1	2017	£600,000	
33	MF	(Denmark)	Casper Sloth	23	2014	14	0	2017	£600,000	
34	FW	(Italy)	Mirco Antenucci	30	2014	37	10	2016	£440,000	
35	DF	(Italy)	Dario Del Fabro	20	2014	1	0	2015	Loan	On loan from Cagliari
40	MF	(England)	Kalvin Phillips	19	2014	2	1	2015	Youth system	

- Last updated: 2 May 2015
- Source: Wikipedia players' articles, Leeds United, Sky Sports
- Ordered by Squad Number.

Appearances (starts and substitute appearances) and goals include those in the Championship (and playoffs), League One (and playoffs), FA Cup, League Cup and Football League Trophy.

=== Appearances and goals ===
As of 2 May 2015

No.	Pos	Nat	Player	Total		Championship		FA Cup		League Cup	
No.	Pos	Nat	Player	Apps	Goals	Apps	Goals	Apps	Goals	Apps	Goals
1	GK	(Italy) ITA	Marco Silvestri	44	0	43+0	0	1+0	0	0+0	0
2	DF	(England) ENG	Sam Byram	39	3	36+3	3	0+0	0	0+0	0
3	DF	(Ivory Coast) CIV	Sol Bamba (On loan from Palermo)	19	1	19+0	1	0+0	0	0+0	0
4	MF	(Jamaica) JAM	Rodolph Austin	31	3	24+6	3	1+0	0	0+0	0
5	DF	(Italy) ITA	Giuseppe Bellusci	30	2	29+1	2	0+0	0	0+0	0
6	MF	(France) FRA	Granddi Ngoyi (On loan from Palermo)	1	0	1+0	0	0+0	0	0+0	0
7	MF	(England) ENG	Luke Murphy	32	3	26+4	3	1+0	0	1+0	0
8	FW	(England) ENG	Billy Sharp	35	5	17+16	5	0+1	0	1+0	0
9	FW	(Brazil) BRA	Adryan (on loan from Flamengo)	13	0	9+3	0	1+0	0	0+0	0
10	FW	(Albania) ALB	Edgar Çani (on loan from Catania)	4	0	0+4	0	0+0	0	0+0	0
11	MF	(Ireland) EIR	Aidy White	1	0	0+1	0	0+0	0	0+0	0
12	DF	(Switzerland) SUI	Gaetano Berardi	24	0	19+3	0	1+0	0	1+0	0
13	GK	(England) ENG	Stuart Taylor	5	0	3+0	0	0+0	0	2+0	0
14	MF	(Italy) ITA	Tommaso Bianchi	26	0	24+0	0	0+0	0	2+0	0
15	DF	(England) ENG	Scott Wootton	25	0	23+0	0	0+0	0	2+0	0
19	FW	(Wales) WAL	Steve Morison	26	2	17+9	2	0+0	0	0+0	0
21	DF	(England) ENG	Charlie Taylor	25	2	22+1	2	1+0	0	1+0	0
22	MF	(England) ENG	Zac Thompson	0	0	0+0	0	0+0	0	0+0	0
23	MF	(England) ENG	Lewis Cook	38	0	33+4	0	0+0	0	1+0	0
24	MF	(Wales) WAL	Chris Dawson	3	0	0+3	0	0+0	0	0+0	0
25	DF	(England) ENG	Ross Killock	0	0	0+0	0	0+0	0	0+0	0
26	FW	(Paraguay) PAR	Brian Montenegro (on loan from Nacional)	6	0	0+5	0	1+0	0	0+0	0
27	MF	(England) ENG	Alex Mowatt	38	9	37+1	9	0+0	0	0+0	0
28	FW	(England) ENG	Lewis Walters	0	0	0+0	0	0+0	0	0+0	0
29	FW	(Senegal) SEN	Souleymane Doukara	27	7	16+9	5	0+1	0	1+0	2
30	GK	(England) ENG	Alex Cairns	0	0	0+0	0	0+0	0	0+0	0
31	MF	(Slovenia) SLO	Žan Benedičič (on loan from Milan)	2	0	0+1	0	0+0	0	0+1	0
32	DF	(Scotland) SCO	Liam Cooper	31	1	25+4	1	1+0	0	1+0	0
33	MF	(Denmark) DEN	Casper Sloth	14	0	7+6	0	1+0	0	0+0	0
34	FW	(Italy) ITA	Mirco Antenucci	37	10	24+12	10	1+0	0	0+0	0
35	DF	(Italy) ITA	Dario Del Fabro (on loan from Cagliari)	1	0	0+0	0	1+0	0	0+0	0
40	MF	(England) ENG	Kalvin Phillips	2	1	2+0	1	0+0	0	0+0	0
Players currently out on loan:
16	FW	(England) ENG	Nicky Ajose (On loan to Crewe Alexandra)	4	0	2+1	0	0+0	0	1+0	0
18	MF	(England) ENG	Michael Tonge (On loan to Millwall)	12	0	4+6	0	0+0	0	2+0	0
Players who have been available for selection this season, but have now permanently left the club:
3	DF	(England) ENG	Stephen Warnock (joined Derby County on 15 January 2015)	22	1	21+0	1	0+0	0	1+0	0
6	DF	(England) ENG	Jason Pearce (joined Wigan Athletic on 30 January 2015)	23	0	20+1	0	0+0	0	2+0	0
9	FW	(England) ENG	Matt Smith (joined Fulham on 1 September 2014)	5	1	1+2	0	0+0	0	2+0	1
10	FW	(Ireland) EIR	Noel Hunt (joined Ipswich Town on 8 January 2015)	2	0	1+0	0	0+0	0	0+1	0
20	MF	(England) ENG	David Norris (Contract terminated on 2 February 2015)	1	0	0+0	0	0+0	0	1+0	0
26	FW	(England) ENG	Dominic Poleon (joined Oldham Athletic on 1 September 2014)	6	0	0+4	0	0+0	0	0+2	0

Source: Sky Sports

== Transfers ==
=== In ===
Date	Pos.	Player	Transferred from†	Fee	Ref.
3 July 2014	GK	Stuart Taylor (ENG)	(Reading)	Free transfer	
9 July 2014	GK	Marco Silvestri (ITA)	Chievo	Undisclosed	
12 July 2014	MF	Tommaso Bianchi (ITA)	Sassuolo	Undisclosed	
19 July 2014	DF	Gaetano Berardi (SUI)	Sampdoria	Undisclosed	
5 August 2014	FW	Nicky Ajose (ENG)	Peterborough United	£150,000	
13 August 2014	FW	Billy Sharp (ENG)	Southampton	£600,000	
13 August 2014	DF	Liam Cooper (SCO)	Chesterfield	£600,000	
20 August 2014	FW	Mirco Antenucci (ITA)	Ternana	£440,000	
21 August 2014	DF	Giuseppe Bellusci (ITA)	Catania	£1,600,000	
25 August 2014	MF	Casper Sloth (DEN)	AGF	£600,000	
1 September 2014	FW	Souleymane Doukara (MRT)	Catania	£1,500,000	

† Brackets around club names denote the player's contract with that club had expired before he joined Leeds.

=== Out ===
Date	Pos.	Player	Transferred to†	Fee	Ref.
23 June 2014	DF	Lee Peltier (ENG)	(Huddersfield Town)	Contract terminated	
30 June 2014	GK	Jamie Ashdown (ENG)	(Crawley Town)	Released	
30 June 2014	MF	Michael Brown (ENG)	(Port Vale)	Released	
30 June 2014	FW	El Hadji Diouf (SEN)	(Sabah)	Released	
30 June 2014	DF	Adam Drury (ENG)		Retired	
30 June 2014	MF	Paul Green (IRL)	(Rotherham United)	Released	
30 June 2014	MF	Danny Pugh (ENG)	(Coventry City)	Released	
30 June 2014	FW	Luke Varney (ENG)	(Blackburn Rovers)	Released	
30 June 2014	MF	Simon Lenighan (ENG)	(Harrogate Town)	Released	
30 June 2014	MF	Nathan Turner (ENG)	(Bradford (Park Avenue))	Released	
30 June 2014	DF	Lewis Turner (ENG)	(Harrogate Town)	Released	
30 June 2014	MF	Gboly Ariyibi (USA)	(Chesterfield)	Released	
1 July 2014	DF	Marius Žaliūkas (LTU)	(Rangers)	Contract terminated	
8 July 2014	FW	Ross McCormack (SCO)	Fulham	Undisclosed (reported to be £11 million)	
31 July 2014	DF	Tom Lees (ENG)	Sheffield Wednesday	Undisclosed	
18 August 2014	GK	Paddy Kenny (IRL)	(Bolton Wanderers)	Contract terminated	
1 September 2014	FW	Matt Smith (ENG)	Fulham	£500,000	
1 September 2014	FW	Dominic Poleon (ENG)	Oldham Athletic	£100,000	
7 January 2015	FW	Noel Hunt (IRE)	(Ipswich Town)	Contract terminated	
15 January 2015	DF	Stephen Warnock (ENG)	Derby County	Undisclosed	
30 January 2015	DF	Jason Pearce (ENG)	Wigan Athletic	£300,000	
2 February 2015	MF	David Norris (ENG)	(Peterborough United)	Contract terminated	

† Brackets around club names denote the player joined that club after his Leeds contract expired.

=== Loans in ===
Date from	Pos.	Player	Loaned from	Date until	Ref.
12 July 2014	FW	Souleymane Doukara (MRT)	Catania	1 September 2014	
4 August 2014	MF	Žan Benedičič (SLO)	Milan	End of season	
12 August 2014	DF	Giuseppe Bellusci (ITA)	Catania	21 August 2014	
30 August 2014	FW	Adryan (BRA)	Flamengo	End of season	
31 August 2014	DF	Dario Del Fabro (ITA)	Cagliari	End of season	
1 September 2014	FW	Brian Montenegro (PAR)	Club Nacional	End of season	
23 January 2015	DF	Sol Bamba (CIV)	Palermo	End of season	
26 January 2015	MF	Granddi Ngoyi (DRC)	Palermo	End of season	
2 February 2015	FW	Edgar Çani (ALB)	Catania	End of season	

=== Loans out ===
Date from	Pos.	Player	Loaned to	Date until	Ref.
3 October 2014	DF	Lewie Coyle (ENG)	Harrogate Town	10 October 2014	
10 October 2014	DF	Jake Skelton (ENG)	Guiseley	10 November 2014	
26 November 2014	FW	Nicky Ajose (ENG)	Crewe Alexandra	End of season	
27 November 2014	FW	Noel Hunt (IRL)	Ipswich Town	3 January 2015	
27 November 2014	DF	Scott Wootton (ENG)	Rotherham United	10 January 2015	
16 January 2015	DF	Ross Killock (ENG)	Halifax Town	12 March 2015	
2 February 2015	MF	Michael Tonge (ENG)	Millwall	31 May 2015	

=== New contracts ===
No.	Pos.	Nat.	Name	Age	Status	Contract length	Expiry date	Source
—	DF	(England)	Afolabi Coker	31	Signed	1 year	June 2015	
30	GK	(England)	Alex Cairns	33	Signed	1 year	June 2015	
25	DF	(England)	Ross Killock	32	Signed	1 year	June 2015	
21	DF	(England)	Charlie Taylor	33	Signed	3 years	June 2017	
—	GK	(England)	Dan Atkinson	30	Signed	1 year	June 2015	
—	DF	(England)	Luke Booker	30	Signed	1 year	June 2015	
—	DF	(England)	Lewie Coyle	31	Signed	1 year	June 2015	
—	MF	(England)	Tyler Denton	31	Signed	1 year	June 2015	
—	DF	(England)	Jake Skelton	30	Signed	1 year	June 2015	
—	DF	(England)	Kalvin Phillips	30	Signed	1 year	June 2015	
—	DF	(England)	Alex Purver	30	Signed	1 year	June 2015	
9	FW	(England)	Matt Smith	37	Signed	3 years	June 2017	
25	DF	(England)	Ross Killock	32	Signed	1 year	June 2016	
15	DF	(England)	Scott Wootton	35	Signed	2 years	June 2017	

== Awards ==
=== Internal Awards ===
==== Official Player of the Year Awards ====
The results of the 2014–15 Leeds United F.C. Player of the Year Awards were announced at a dinner on 2 May 2015 at Elland Road.

- Fans' Player of the Year: Alex Mowatt
- Young Player of the Year: Lewis Cook
- Players' Player of the Year: Alex Mowatt
- Goal of the Season: Rodolph Austin (vs Watford, 28 February 2015)
