= Salerno (surname) =

Salerno is a surname. Notable people with the surname include:

- Adriana Salerno (born 1979), Venezuelan-American mathematician
- Anthony Salerno (1911–1992), Italian-American mobster
- Enrico Maria Salerno (1926–1994), Italian actor
- Fabio Salerno (born 1979), Italian Catholic priest and second secretary to the Pope
- Francesco Carmelo Salerno (1925–1998), Member of the Italian parliament and Football Club Manager
- Jessica Salerno, American psychologist
- Joe Salerno (born 1981), American basketball coach
- José Salerno (1914–1984), Argentine football player and manager
- Joseph P. Salerno (1914–1981), American architect
- Joseph T. Salerno (born 1950), Austrian School economist
- José Luis Salerno, Argentine crime suspect
- Nicola Salerno (1910–1969), Italian lyricist
- Nicola Salerno (sporting executive) (1956–2026), Italian football sporting director
- Ralph Salerno (1925-2003), New York police officer, author and recognized expert on the American mafia
- Randy Salerno (1963–2008), American news anchor
- Sabrina Salerno (born 1968), Italian singer, showgirl, model, actress and record producer
- Shane Salerno (born 1972), American screenwriter and producer
