= Salerne (disambiguation) =

Salerne is a red wine grape.

Salerne may also refer to:

- John Salerne (disambiguation)
- Gismund of Salerne

== See also ==
- Salernes, a commune in the Var department, Provence-Alpes-Côte d'Azur, France
- Salerno (disambiguation)
