= 2016 Viking FK season =

Viking
2016 season
- President: Charlie Granfelt
- Manager: Kjell Jonevret
- Stadium: Viking Stadion
- Tippeligaen: 8th
- Norwegian Cup: Third round
- Top goalscorer: League: Three Players (5); All: Patrick Pedersen (10)
Home colours	Away colours

The 2016 season was Viking's fourth full season with Kjell Jonevret as manager. They are competing in the Tippeligaen and the cup.

== Squad ==
As of 30 August 2016

Note: Flags indicate national team as defined under FIFA eligibility rules; some limited exceptions apply. Players may hold more than one non-FIFA nationality.

No.	Pos.	Nation	Player
1	GK	NOR	Iven Austbø (Vice-captain)
2	DF	NOR	Rasmus Martinsen
4	MF	NOR	Joackim Jørgensen
6	DF	EST	Karol Mets
7	FW	NGR	Samuel Adegbenro
8	MF	WAL	Chris Dawson (loan from Rotherham United)
9	FW	DEN	Patrick Pedersen
11	FW	NOR	Zymer Bytyqi
13	DF	NOR	Per Magnus Steiring (loan from Rosenborg)
14	MF	NOR	André Danielsen (Captain)
16	MF	NOR	Abdisalam Ibrahim
17	FW	NGR	Aniekpeno Udoh
18	DF	NOR	Julian Ryerson

No.	Pos.	Nation	Player
19	MF	NOR	Michael Haukås
20	MF	NOR	Tor André Skimmeland Aasheim
21	MF	NOR	Herman Kleppa
22	DF	DEN	Claes Kronberg
24	GK	NOR	Pål Vestly Heigre
25	MF	NGR	Usman Sale
26	DF	NOR	Erik Steen
27	FW	NOR	Mathias Bringaker
28	DF	NOR	Kristoffer Haugen
29	FW	NOR	Martin Hummervoll
30	MF	NOR	Stian Michalsen
—	MF	NOR	Andreas Breimyr

== Transfers ==
=== Winter ===
In: Note: Flags indicate national team as defined under FIFA eligibility rules; some limited exceptions apply. Players may hold more than one non-FIFA nationality.

No.	Pos.	Nation	Player
9	FW	DEN	Patrick Pedersen (from (Iceland) Valur)
16	MF	NOR	Abdisalam Ibrahim (from (Greece) Veria)
17	FW	NGR	Aniekpeno Udoh (from (Nigeria) Akwa United)
18	DF	NOR	Julian Ryerson (Promoted)
19	MF	NOR	Michael Haukås (from (Norway) Haugesund)
20	FW	NOR	Tor André Aasheim (from (Norway) Haugesund)
21	MF	NOR	Herman Kleppa (Promoted)
24	GK	NOR	Pål Vestly Heigre (loan return from (Norway) Tromsø)
25	MF	NGR	Usman Sale (from (Nigeria) Wikki Tourists)
26	DF	NOR	Erik Steen (Promoted)
27	MF	NOR	Mathias Bringaker (Promoted)

Out: Note: Flags indicate national team as defined under FIFA eligibility rules; some limited exceptions apply. Players may hold more than one non-FIFA nationality.

No.	Pos.	Nation	Player
1	GK	NOR	Arild Østbø (to (Norway) Sarpsborg 08)
8	MF	NOR	Vidar Nisja (to (Norway) Sandnes Ulf)
10	FW	ENG	Kieffer Moore (to (England) Forest Green Rovers)
11	MF	SEN	Makhtar Thioune (to (Turkey) Şanlıurfaspor)
20	DF	ISL	Indriði Sigurðsson (to (Iceland) KR)
21	MF	NOR	Julian Veen Uldal (to (Norway) Randaberg)
23	MF	ISL	Steinþór Freyr Þorsteinsson (on loan to (Norway) Sandnes Ulf)
24	DF	NOR	Aleksander Solli (to (Norway) Raufoss)
29	FW	NOR	Martin Hummervoll (on loan to (Iceland) ÍA)
30	MF	NOR	Stian Michalsen (on loan to (Norway) Sola)

=== Summer ===
In: Note: Flags indicate national team as defined under FIFA eligibility rules; some limited exceptions apply. Players may hold more than one non-FIFA nationality.

No.	Pos.	Nation	Player
8	MF	WAL	Chris Dawson (on loan from (England) Rotherham United)
13	DF	NOR	Per-Magnus Steiring (on loan from (Norway) Rosenborg)
24	GK	NOR	Pål Vestly Heigre (loan return from (Norway) Lillestrøm)
29	FW	NOR	Martin Hummervoll (loan return from (Iceland) ÍA)
30	FW	NOR	Stian Michalsen (loan return from (Norway) Sola)
—	MF	NOR	Andreas Breimyr (from (England) Crystal Palace)

Out: Note: Flags indicate national team as defined under FIFA eligibility rules; some limited exceptions apply. Players may hold more than one non-FIFA nationality.

No.	Pos.	Nation	Player
5	DF	USA	A.J. Soares (to (Denmark) AGF)
8	FW	NGR	Suleiman Abdullahi (to (Germany) Eintracht Braunschweig)
10	MF	ISL	Björn Daníel Sverrisson (to (Denmark) AGF)
15	GK	NOR	Amund Wichne (on loan to (Norway) Åsane)
24	GK	NOR	Pål Vestly Heigre (on loan to (Norway) Lillestrøm)

== Friendlies ==
5 August 2016	Viking (Norway)	0–8	(England) Arsenal	Stavanger
20:30 CET (UTC+1)	Mets (yellow card) 4'	Summary	Campbell 33', 59'; Cazorla 50' (yellow card) 79'; Walcott 53'; Haukås 55' (o.g.); Iwobi 71', 81'; Akpom (yellow card) 89'	Stadium: Viking Stadion; Attendance: 13,933; Referee: Tore Hansen

== Competitions ==
=== Tippeligaen ===
==== Table ====
Pos	Team	Pld	W	D	L	GF	GA	GD	Pts
6	Sarpsborg 08	30	12	9	9	35	37	−2	45
7	Strømsgodset	30	12	8	10	44	40	+4	44
8	Viking	30	12	7	11	33	35	−2	43
9	Aalesund	30	12	6	12	46	51	−5	42
10	Vålerenga	30	10	8	12	41	39	+2	38

Source: Football Association of Norway (in Norwegian), Soccerway
Rules for classification: 1) Points; 2) Goal difference; 3) Goals scored; 4) Head-to-head points; 5) Head-to-head goal difference; 6) Head-to-head away goals scored (between two teams).

==== Results summary ====
Overall								Home						Away					
Pld	W	D	L	GF	GA	GD	Pts	W	D	L	GF	GA	GD	W	D	L	GF	GA	GD
30	12	7	11	33	35	−2	43	5	4	6	16	17	−1	7	3	5	17	18	−1

Last updated: 9 November 2016.
Source: see below

==== Results by round ====
Round	1	2	3	4	5	6	7	8	9	10	11	12	13	14	15	16	17	18	19	20	21	22	23	24	25	26	27	28	29	30
Ground	H	A	H	A	A	H	A	H	H	A	H	A	H	A	A	A	A	A	H	H	A	H	A	H	A	H	A	H	A	H
Result	W	D	W	L	W	L	L	W	W	L	D	W	W	W	L	L	D	W	L	D	L	D	D	W	L	W	D	L	W	L
Position	2	3	3	6	4	7	8	8	6	8	7	6	5	4	5	6	7	7	7	8	8	8	8	6	8	7	7	8	8	8

Updated to match(es) played on 9 November 2016. Source: see below
A = Away; H = Home; W = Win; D = Draw; L = Loss

==== Results ====
14 March 2016 1	Vålerenga	0–2	Viking	Oslo
19:00 CET (UTC+1)	Stengel (yellow card) 60'; Wæhler (yellow card) 78'	Summary	Soares (yellow card) 17'; Sverrisson 22' (yellow card) 87'; Haugen (yellow card) 66'; Bringaker 88'	Stadium: Ullevaal Stadion; Attendance: 7,573; Referee: Kim Andre Johnsen

20 March 2016 2	Viking	0–0	Sarpsborg 08	Stavanger
18:00 CET (UTC+1)	Soares (yellow card) 22'	Summary	Hansen (yellow card) 44'; Hovda (yellow card) 85'	Stadium: Viking Stadion; Attendance: 8,536; Referee: Ola Hobber Nilsen

2 April 2016 3	Start	0–1	Viking	Kristiansand
15:30 CEST (UTC+2)	Ajer (yellow card) 58'	Summary	Abdullahi 27'; Sverrisson (yellow card) 54'; Danielsen (yellow card) 60'	Stadium: Sør Arena; Attendance: 6,112; Referee: Trygve Kjensli

10 April 2016 4	Viking	0–2	Odd	Stavanger
20:00 CEST (UTC+2)	Abdullahi (yellow card) 29'; Ibrahim (yellow card) 65'	Summary	Bentley 13'; Zekhnini 25'; Berg (yellow card) 58'; Ruud (yellow card) 69'	Stadium: Viking Stadion; Attendance: 7,995; Referee: Tommy Skjerven

17 April 2016 5	Aalesund	1–2	Viking	Ålesund
18:00 CEST (UTC+2)	Boli 11'; Larsen (yellow card) 14'; Carlsen (yellow card) 24'; Kirkeskov (yellow card) 71'; B. H. Riise (yellow card) 89'	Summary	Adegbenro (yellow card) 4'; Bringaker 41'; Abdullahi 56'	Stadium: Color Line Stadion; Attendance: 5,798; Referee: Trond Ivar Døvle

21 April 2016 6	Viking	0–1	Brann	Stavanger
19:00 CEST (UTC+2)		Summary	Vega (yellow card) 52'; Acosta (yellow card) 56'; Grønner (yellow card) 87'; Haugen 90+4'	Stadium: Viking Stadion; Attendance: 11,089; Referee: Dag Vidar Hafsås

24 April 2016 7	Rosenborg	4–0	Viking	Trondheim
18:00 CEST (UTC+2)	Eyjólfsson 30'; Jensen 58'; Konradsen (yellow card) 73'; Þórarinsson 75'; Gytkjær 82'	Summary	Soares (yellow card) 86'	Stadium: Lerkendal Stadion; Attendance: 15,985; Referee: Ola Hobber Nilsen

1 May 2016 8	Viking	3–2	Haugesund	Stavanger
15:30 CEST (UTC+2)	Bringaker 35'; Adegbenro (yellow card) 54'; Abdullahi 71', 73'; Ibrahim (yellow card) 84'; Mets (yellow card) 90+6'	Summary	Agdestein 14', 86'; Kiss (yellow card) 22'; Skjerve (yellow card) 36'; Tronstad (yellow card) 78'; Troost-Ekong (yellow card) 90'	Stadium: Viking Stadion; Attendance: 9,032; Referee: Tore Hansen

7 May 2016 9	Viking	2–0	Tromsø	Stavanger
15:30 CEST (UTC+2)	Danielsen (yellow card) 66'; Sverrisson 78'; Adegbenro 85'	Summary	Moussa (yellow card) 62'; Ødegaard (yellow card) 71'	Stadium: Viking Stadion; Attendance: 7,302; Referee: Kai Erik Steen

12 May 2016 10	Stabæk	1–0	Viking	Bærum
19:00 CEST (UTC+2)	Asante 77'	Summary		Stadium: Nadderud Stadion; Attendance: 3,289; Referee: Tore Hansen

16 May 2016 11	Viking	0–0	Sogndal	Stavanger
18:00 CEST (UTC+2)		Summary	Ramsland (yellow card) 24'; Raitala (yellow card) 72'	Stadium: Viking Stadion; Attendance: 11,321; Referee: Trygve Kjensli

22 May 2016 12	Lillestrøm	1–2	Viking	Lillestrøm
20:00 CEST (UTC+2)	Jradi (yellow card) 16'; Innocent (yellow card) 28'; Martin 77' (pen.)	Summary	Abdullahi 22'; Austbø (yellow card) 76'; Adegbenro 89'; Soares (yellow card) 90'	Stadium: Åråsen Stadion; Attendance: 4,081; Referee: Tommy Skjerven

29 May 2016 13	Viking	2–0	Bodø/Glimt	Stavanger
18:00 CEST (UTC+2)	Sverrisson 4'; Kronberg 20'; Ibrahim (yellow card) 80'	Summary	Edvardsen (yellow card) 49'; Bjørnbak (yellow card) 53'; Hauge (yellow card) 90+1'	Stadium: Viking Stadion; Attendance: 10,165; Referee: Kim Andre Johnsen

3 July 2016 14	Molde	0–1	Viking	Molde
18:00 CEST (UTC+2)	Diouf (yellow card) 55'	Summary	Danielsen (yellow card) 66'; Bringaker 71'; Haugen (yellow card) 72'	Stadium: Aker Stadion; Attendance: 8,211; Referee: Dag Vidar Hafsås

9 July 2016 15	Viking	0–1	Strømsgodset	Stavanger
15:30 CEST (UTC+2)	Adegbenro (yellow card) 45+2'; Jørgensen (yellow card) 82'	Summary	Hamoud (yellow card) 56'; Keita 78'; Pedersen (yellow card) 83'	Stadium: Viking Stadion; Attendance: 7,419; Referee: Trond Ivar Døvle

16 July 2016 16	Haugesund	4–1	Viking	Haugesund
15:30 CEST (UTC+2)	Agdestein 16'; Hajradinović (yellow card) 39'; Kiss (yellow card) 56'; Stølås 70', 76' (yellow card) 74'; Abdi 86'	Summary	Haukås 12'; Pedersen (yellow card) 23'; Ibrahim (yellow card) 54'; Mets (yellow card) 62'	Stadium: Haugesund Stadion; Attendance: 6,077; Referee: Tore Hansen

24 July 2016 17	Odd	2–2	Viking	Skien
18:00 CEST (UTC+2)	Ibrahim 40'; Haukås (yellow card) 78'	Summary	Berge 53'; Occéan 78' (yellow card) 90+3'	Stadium: Skagerak Arena; Attendance: 6,991; Referee: Trygve Kjensli

30 July 2016 18	Viking	Postponed^{1}	Rosenborg	Stavanger
18:00 CEST (UTC+2)				Stadium: Viking Stadion

7 August 2016 19	Sogndal	1–2	Viking	Sogndalsfjøra
20:00 CEST (UTC+2)	Sveen (yellow card) 70'; Holsæter (yellow card) 88'; Otoo 90'	Summary	Sverrisson 39'; Adegbenro (yellow card) 61' (goal) 80'; Ibrahim (yellow card) 86'	Stadium: Fosshaugane Campus; Attendance: 2,906; Referee: Espen Eskås

11 August 2016 18	Viking	0–2	Rosenborg	Stavanger
19:00 CEST (UTC+2)		Summary	Gersbach (yellow card) 6'; Gytkjær 72', 79'	Stadium: Viking Stadion; Attendance: 7,843; Referee: Tommy Skjerven

14 August 2016 20	Viking	2–2	Stabæk	Stavanger
20:00 CEST (UTC+2)	Aasheim 50'; Pedersen 61'	Summary	Asante 30'; Meling (yellow card) 61' (goal) 71'; Skjønsberg (yellow card) 78'; Nilsson (yellow card) 85'	Stadium: Viking Stadion; Attendance: 7,269; Referee: KimAndre Johnsen

21 August 2016 21	Tromsø	2–1	Viking	Tromsø
20:00 CEST (UTC+2)	Antonsen (yellow card) 12'; Åsen 13' (yellow card) 41'; Andersen 64' (pen.)	Summary	Ibrahim (yellow card) 49'; Haukås (yellow card) 68'; Dawson (yellow card) 70'; Pedersen 83'	Stadium: Alfheim Stadion; Attendance: 3,412; Referee: Martin Lundby

28 August 2016 22	Viking	2–2	Lillestrøm	Stavanger
18:00 CEST (UTC+2)	Danielsen 18'; Ryerson 62'	Summary	Knudtzon 20' (yellow card) 65'; Lundemo 83'	Stadium: Viking Stadion; Attendance: 7,756; Referee: Trygve Kjensli

10 September 2016 23	Brann	0–0	Viking	Bergen
18:00 CEST (UTC+2)		Summary		Stadium: Brann Stadion; Attendance: 11,674; Referee: Tom Harald Hagen

17 September 2016 24	Viking	1–0	Molde	Stavanger
18:00 CEST (UTC+2)	Pedersen 9'; Kronberg (yellow card) 89'	Summary	Aursnes (yellow card) 33'; Gabrielsen (yellow card) 59'	Stadium: Viking Stadion; Attendance: 9,681; Referee: Martin Lundby

24 September 2016 25	Sarpsborg 08	1–0	Viking	Sarpsborg
15:30 CEST (UTC+2)	Kachi 6'; Lindberg (yellow card) 50'; Thomassen (yellow card) 65'; Groven (yellow card) 90+4'; Trondsen (yellow card) 90+5'	Summary	Haukås (yellow card) 87'; Kronberg (yellow card) 90+2'	Stadium: Sarpsborg Stadion; Attendance: 4,027; Referee: Ola Hobber Nilsen

2 October 2016 26	Viking	2–0	Start	Stavanger
20:00 CEST (UTC+2)	Heikkilä 26' (o.g.); Jørgensen 67'	Summary	Robstad (yellow card) 52'	Stadium: Viking Stadion; Attendance: 8,371; Referee: Trond Ivar Døvle

14 October 2016 27	Strømsgodset	1–1	Viking	Drammen
19:00 CEST (UTC+2)	Andersen 1'; Adjei-Boateng (yellow card) 62'	Summary	Ibrahim 57'; Bytyqi (yellow card) 78'	Stadium: Marienlyst Stadion; Attendance: 6,645; Referee: Espen Eskås

21 October 2016 28	Viking	2–3	Aalesund	Stavanger
19:00 CEST (UTC+2)	Pedersen 26'; Mets (red card) 56'; Dawson (yellow card) 59'; Haugen (yellow card) 68'; Ibrahim (yellow card) 77'; Sale (yellow card) 86'; Bringaker 90'	Report	Mos 35', 57' (pen.) (yellow card) 90+4'; Kirkeskov 69'	Stadium: Viking Stadion; Attendance: 7,069; Referee: Kai Erik Steen

30 October 2016 29	Bodø/Glimt	0–2	Viking	Bodø
18:00 CET (UTC+1)		Summary	Sale 39'; Danielsen 79' (pen.)	Stadium: Aspmyra Stadion; Attendance: 2,984; Referee: Trond Ivar Døvle

6 November 2016 30	Viking	0–2	Vålerenga	Stavanger
18:00 CET (UTC+1)	Jørgensen (yellow card) 76'; Mets (yellow card) 80'; Bringaker (yellow card) 90+4'	Summary	Moa 43'; Wæhler (yellow card) 66'; Grødem 90'; Sandberg (yellow card) 90+4'	Stadium: Viking Stadion; Attendance: 11,347; Referee: Tore Hansen

=== Norwegian Cup ===
13 April 2016 First round	Vardeneset	1–5	Viking	Vardeneset
18:00 CEST (UTC+2)	M.Hebnes 65'; K.Høvring (yellow card) 68'	Summary	Udoh 40' (yellow card) 83'; Pedersen 43', 59', 62', 78'; Aasheim (yellow card) 76'	Stadium: Modenabanen; Attendance: 1,650; Referee: Ola Kellerhals

27 April 2016 Second round	Vard Haugesund	0–3	Viking	Haugesund
18:00 CEST (UTC+2)	T. Undheim (yellow card) 20'; R. Løvland (yellow card) 59'; B. Sumareh (yellow card) 78'; Andersen (yellow card) 89'	Summary	Bringaker 52'; Pedersen 61'; Adegbenro 90'	Stadium: Haugesund Stadion; Attendance: 500; Referee: Daniel Higraff

4 May 2016 Third round	Vidar	2–1	Viking	Stavanger
18:00 CEST (UTC+2)	Bjørshol (yellow card) 45'; I. Halgunset (yellow card) 51', (goal) 63'; A. Westly 54'; S. Christensen (yellow card) 90+2'	Summary	Abdullahi 34'; Ryerson (yellow card) 67'; Danielsen (yellow card) 74'	Stadium: Lassa Idrettspark; Attendance: 600; Referee: Sivert Amland

== Squad statistics ==
As of match played 6 November 2016

=== Appearances and goals ===
No.	Pos	Nat	Player	Total		Tippeligaen		Norwegian Cup	
No.	Pos	Nat	Player	Apps	Goals	Apps	Goals	Apps	Goals
1	GK	(Norway) NOR	Iven Austbø	30	0	30	0	0	0
2	DF	(Norway) NOR	Rasmus Martinsen	2	0	0+1	0	0+1	0
4	DF	(Norway) NOR	Joackim Jørgensen	25	1	20+3	1	2	0
6	DF	(Estonia) EST	Karol Mets	32	0	29	0	3	0
7	FW	(Nigeria) NGR	Samuel Adegbenro	31	4	27+1	3	3	1
8	MF	(Wales) WAL	Chris Dawson	10	0	5+5	0	0	0
9	FW	(Denmark) DEN	Patrick Pedersen	30	10	17+10	5	3	5
11	FW	(Norway) NOR	Zymer Bytyqi	20	0	7+11	0	2	0
13	DF	(Norway) NOR	Per-Magnus Steiring	4	0	1+3	0	0	0
14	MF	(Norway) NOR	André Danielsen	30	2	29	2	0+1	0
16	MF	(Norway) NOR	Abdisalam Ibrahim	26	2	25	2	1	0
17	FW	(Nigeria) NGR	Aniekpeno Udoh	5	1	0+3	0	1+1	1
18	DF	(Norway) NOR	Julian Ryerson	20	1	12+6	1	2	0
19	MF	(Norway) NOR	Michael Haukås	27	1	12+12	1	3	0
20	MF	(Norway) NOR	Tor André Aasheim	16	1	10+4	1	0+2	0
22	MF	(Denmark) DEN	Claes Kronberg	29	0	25+3	0	1	0
24	GK	(Norway) NOR	Pål Vestly Heigre	3	0	0	0	3	0
25	MF	(Nigeria) NGR	Usman Sale	11	1	2+7	1	1+1	0
27	FW	(Norway) NOR	Mathias Bringaker	26	6	8+16	5	1+1	1
28	DF	(Norway) NOR	Kristoffer Haugen	29	0	26	0	3	0
30	MF	(Norway) NOR	Stian Michalsen	1	0	0+1	0	0	0
Players away from Viking on loan:
Players who left Viking during the season:
5	DF	(United States) USA	A. J. Soares	15	0	12	0	3	0
8	FW	(Nigeria) NGR	Suleiman Abdullahi	15	6	13	5	1+1	1
10	MF	(Iceland) ISL	Björn Daníel Sverrisson	21	4	20	4	0+1	0

=== Goal scorers ===
Place	Position	Nation	Number	Name	Tippeligaen	Norwegian Cup	Total
1	FW	(Denmark)	9	Patrick Pedersen	5	5	10
2	FW	(Nigeria)	8	Suleiman Abdullahi	5	1	6
2	FW	(Norway)	27	Mathias Bringaker	5	1	5
4	MF	(Iceland)	10	Björn Daníel Sverrisson	4	0	4
4	FW	(Nigeria)	7	Samuel Adegbenro	3	1	4
6	MF	(Norway)	16	Abdisalam Ibrahim	2	0	2
6	MF	(Norway)	14	André Danielsen	2	0	2
8	MF	(Denmark)	22	Claes Kronberg	1	0	1
8	MF	(Norway)	19	Michael Haukås	1	0	1
8	MF	(Norway)	20	Tor André Aasheim	1	0	1
8	DF	(Norway)	18	Julian Ryerson	1	0	1
8	DF	(Norway)	4	Joackim Jørgensen	1	0	1
8	MF	(Nigeria)	25	Usman Sale	1	0	1
8	FW	(Nigeria)	17	Aniekpeno Udoh	0	1	1
8				Own goal	1	0	1
				TOTALS	33	9	42

=== Disciplinary record ===
Number	Nation	Position	Name	Tippeligaen		Norwegian Cup		Total	
Number	Nation	Position	Name	Yellow card	Red card	Yellow card	Red card	Yellow card	Red card
1	(Norway)	GK	Iven Austbø	1	0	0	0	1	0
4	(Norway)	DF	Joackim Jørgensen	2	0	0	0	2	0
5	(United States)	DF	A. J. Soares	4	0	0	0	4	0
6	(Estonia)	DF	Karol Mets	3	1	0	0	3	1
7	(Nigeria)	FW	Samuel Adegbenro	4	0	0	0	4	0
8	(Nigeria)	FW	Suleiman Abdullahi	1	0	0	0	1	0
8	(Wales)	MF	Chris Dawson	2	0	0	0	2	0
9	(Denmark)	FW	Patrick Pedersen	1	0	0	0	1	0
10	(Iceland)	MF	Björn Daníel Sverrisson	2	0	0	0	2	0
11	(Norway)	FW	Zymer Bytyqi	1	0	0	0	1	0
14	(Norway)	MF	André Danielsen	3	0	1	0	4	0
16	(Norway)	MF	Abdisalam Ibrahim	7	0	0	0	7	0
17	(Norway)	DF	Julian Ryerson	0	0	1	0	1	0
19	(Norway)	MF	Michael Haukås	3	0	0	0	3	0
22	(Denmark)	MF	Claes Kronberg	2	0	0	0	2	0
25	(Nigeria)	MF	Usman Sale	2	0	0	0	2	0
27	(Norway)	FW	Mathias Bringaker	1	0	0	0	1	0
28	(Norway)	DF	Kristoffer Haugen	3	0	0	0	3	0
			TOTALS	41	1	2	0	43	1

== Notes ==
- Viking versus Rosenborg was postponed due to Rosenborg participating in European competition.
