= Casper Sloth =

Danish footballer (born 1992)

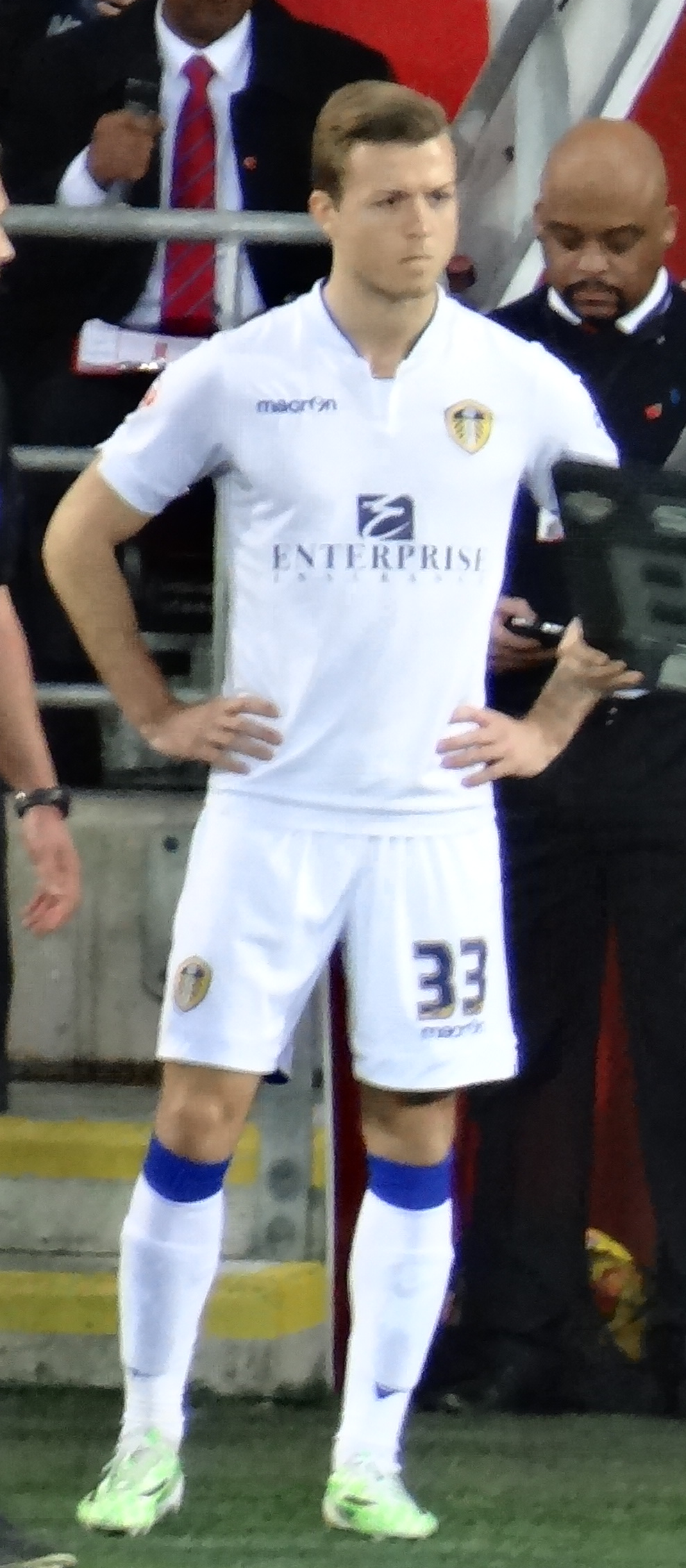

Personal information
- Full name: Casper Bisgaard Sloth
- Date of birth: 26 March 1992 (age 34)
- Place of birth: Aarhus, Denmark
- Height: 1.82 m (6 ft 0 in)
- Position: Central midfielder

Youth career
- 2001–2004: Brabrand IF
- 2004–2009: AGF

Senior career*
Years	Team	Apps	(Gls)
2009–2014	AGF	133	(9)
2014–2016	Leeds United	13	(0)
2016–2017	AaB	21	(0)
2017–2019	Silkeborg	34	(0)
2019–2020	Motherwell	0	(0)
2020	Notts County	0	(0)
2020–2021	Helsingør	4	(0)
2021	Stjarnan	3	(0)

International career
2008–2009	Denmark U17	12	(0)
2009–2010	Denmark U18	7	(0)
2010	Denmark U19	3	(0)
2011	Denmark U20	3	(2)
2011–2013	Denmark U21	10	(0)
2012–2014	Denmark	8	(0)
- * Club domestic league appearances and goals as of 14:01, 22 June 2024 (UTC)

Casper Bisgaard Sloth (/ˈkæspər sloʊt/; born 26 March 1992) is a Danish professional footballer who plays as a midfielder.

== Club career ==
=== AGF ===
Sloth started his youth career at Brabrand IF. He joined AGF academy in 2004, and progressed through the youth system.

Sloth made his AGF senior debut in the Danish Superliga championship on 7 December 2009, aged 17. The game was a 1–1 draw with Esbjerg fB at AGF's NRGi Park stadium. In 2008, former teammate Benny Feilhaber proclaimed Sloth as 'the greatest current talent in Danish football'.

On 1 May 2010, he opened his scoring account for AGF with two goals in a 4–1 win against Silkeborg IF. In October 2012 he was voted Superliga Player of the Month.

During the 2013–14 season, Sloth was unable to help prevent AGF from being relegated from the Danish Superliga.

On 22 August 2014, Yorkshire Evening Press journalist Phil Hay tweeted that a deal had been agreed for Sloth to join Leeds United on a three-year deal.

=== Leeds United ===
Sloth joined Football League Championship side Leeds United on 25 August 2014 on a three-year deal. He was allocated the number 33 shirt for the 2014–15 season. The fee for Sloth was believed to be in the region of £600k.

Sloth made his debut for Leeds on 30 August against Bolton Wanderers. He made 14 appearances in all competitions in his first season at the club, he was favoured more by head coaches Dave Hockaday and Darko Milanic for the first half of the season, with him barely being used by head coach Neil Redfearn in the second half of the season. On 31 July 2015, Sloth was given the number 29 shirt for the upcoming 2015–16 season.

=== AaB ===
On 4 July 2016, Sloth returned to Denmark, signing for AaB for an undisclosed fee.

=== Silkeborg ===
In July 2017, Sloth moved to Silkeborg IF on a two-year deal.

=== Motherwell ===
On 21 May 2019, it was announced that Sloth had signed a two-year deal with Scottish Premiership side Motherwell, with the move due to be completed in June. He left the club on 31 January 2020, his contract being cancelled by mutual consent, having only played once as a substitute in the Scottish League Cup.

=== Notts County ===
On 20 August 2020, Notts County announced that Sloth had signed for the club.

On 6 October 2020, it was announced that Sloth had left Notts County.

=== Helsingør ===
On 29 October 2020 it was confirmed, that Sloth had returned to Denmark and signed with Danish 1st Division club FC Helsingør for the rest of the year. He made his debut for the club on 27 November in a 2–1 victory over Fremad Amager, coming on as a second-half substitute.

=== Stjarnan ===
On 13 June 2021, Sloth signed with Icelandic club Stjarnan.

== International career ==
Sloth has also played more than 30 games for various Danish youth selections, including eight games for the Denmark national under-21 football team.

On 14 November 2012, he made his debut for the senior team in a friendly in Istanbul against Turkey. Sloth played the first half in a game which ended 1–1, and was hailed as one of Denmark's best players of the game.

On 5 March 2014, Sloth started for Denmark in a 1–0 loss to England at Wembley; Sloth put in an impressive performance though despite getting booked for a bad tackle on England's Steven Gerrard. Denmark lost to a late goal from Daniel Sturridge.

== Media ==
In Denmark, Sloth was also the face of Scandinavian hair wax company ID Hair.
