= Jessica Salerno =

American psychologist

Jessica Salerno is an American psychologist known for her research on jury decision-making, discrimination, and emotion as it relates to legal psychology. She is an associate professor in the Department of Psychology at Cornell University as of 2026, as well as an associate member of the Law Faculty.

== Education ==
Salerno received a B.A. in psychology from Middlebury College in 2003. At Middlebury College she worked on a thesis titled "The effect of cross-examination, deliberation and need for cognition of jurors' ability to distinguish between good and bad scientific expert testimony" under Michelle McCauley. She continued her education at the University of Illinois Chicago (UIC) where she was advised by Bette Bottoms. In 2012, she earned her Doctorate of Philosophy in social psychology with a dissertation titled "One angry woman: Emotion expression and minority influence in a jury deliberation context", which she later expanded upon in 2015 with her article "One angry woman: Anger expression increases influence for men, but decreases influence for women, during group deliberation." she authored with Liana Peter-Hagene.

== Career ==
Before moving to Cornell University, Salerno was an assistant professor in the Social and Behavioral Sciences division in the New College of Interdisciplinary Arts and Science at Arizona State University (ASU). During her time there, she was a founding member of the Program on Law and Behavioral Science. The Program on Law and Behavioral Science uses behavioral science, psychology, law, and criminology to conduct research and study how each field interacts with others within the criminal justice system to provide a clearer understanding of the behavior of justice-involved individuals. Additionally, she was a fellow of the Society of Experimental Social Psychology and a member of the Lincoln Center for Applied Ethics at ASU.

In addition to her current position as an associate professor in the Department of Psychology and associate member of the Law Faculty at Cornell University, she is the lab director of the Social Psychology and Law Lab. Alongside her work in academic settings, she is also a researcher and public speaker. As well as working as a professor and researcher, she also functions as the director for the undergraduate Psychology Combined Honors Program at Cornell University.

Additionally, she has worked on an advisory team with Campbell Law, LLC on the Trial By Data (TBD) team. This group oversees the research methods that are conducted by Campbell Law to ensure a high-academic standard of research on decision making and jury psychology.

== Research ==
Her research investigates the intersection of social psychology and law through exploring how legal decision making is impacted through emotions and group dynamics. She has been published in journals such as Behavioral Sciences & the Law, Criminal Justice Studies, Annual Review of Law and Social Science, and Law and Human Behavior. Some of her most cited works include:

- "The Interactive Effect of Anger and Disgust on Moral Outrage and Judgements"
- "Emotion, Proof, and Prejudice: The Cognitive Science of Gruesome Photos and Victim Impact Statements"
- "One Angry Woman: Anger Expression Increases Influence for Men, but Decreases Influence for Women, During Group Deliberation"

She continued her work with Bette Bottoms following the completion of her doctoral program. Some of the most highly cited publications that they worked on together include:

- "Emotional evidence and jurors' judgments: The promise of neuroscience for informing psychology and law"
- "Psychological mechanisms underlying support for juvenile sex offender registry laws: Prototypes, moral outrage, and perceived threat"
- "Are the effects of juvenile offender stereotypes maximized or minimized by jury deliberation?"

== Awards ==
Salerno has received several awards recognizing her contributions to psychology and law. In 2016, she was named a Rising Star by the Association for Psychological Science, which is an award given to early-career researchers whose innovative work has already advanced their field. In 2017, she received the Saleem A. Shah Early Career Award from the American Psychology-Law Society, which honors early career excellence and contributions to the field of psychology and law with a focus on forensic practice, research, or public policy. In her role as a founder of the Program on Law and Behavioral Science, she was awarded the 2020 President's Award for Innovation at ASU with her co-founders. In addition to these awards, her research program has secured funding from federal agencies, including the National Science Foundation and the National Institute of Justice.
