= Tommaso Bianchi =

Italian footballer (born 1988)

Personal information
- Date of birth: 1 November 1988 (age 38)
- Place of birth: Piombino, Italy
- Height: 1.88 m (6 ft 2 in)
- Position: Centre midfielder

Team information
- Current team: Siena
- Number: 8

Youth career
- Follonica
- –2005: Piacenza

Senior career*
Years	Team	Apps	(Gls)
2005–2011	Piacenza	118	(10)
2010	→ Chievo (loan)	0	(0)
2011–2014	Sassuolo	59	(4)
2013–2014	→ Modena (loan)	38	(3)
2014–2016	Leeds United	24	(0)
2016	→ Ascoli (loan)	16	(0)
2016–2018	Ascoli	54	(4)
2018–2021	Novara	71	(7)
2021–2023	Siena	39	(3)
2023	San Donato Tavarnelle	15	(1)
2023–2025	Siena	56	(3)
2025–2026	Follonica Gavorrano	20	(1)

International career
2006	Italy U19	1	(0)
2007–2008	Italy U20	6	(0)
2009	Italy U21	1	(0)
- * Club domestic league appearances and goals as of 17 August 2026

Tommaso Bianchi (born 1 November 1988) is an Italian professional footballer who plays as a midfielder for Serie D club Siena. He is a former Italy U21 international.

== Club career ==
=== Piacenza ===
After starting his career at Follonica. The following year he arrived in the youth team of Piacenza with whom he made his debut in Serie B, on 19 March 2006 against Ternana. On 29 August 2009 scored the first two goals in a 3–2 defeat to Lecce.

On 1 February 2010, he joined Serie A side Chievo on loan, with the option to buy half of his ownership at the end of the deal, however he failed to play a single game for Chievo and returned to Piacenza at the end of the season.

In the first match after returning to Piacenza, the second round of the Italian Cup against Virtus Lanciano, he scored the 4th goal in a 5–3 victory. At the end of the season, he'd made 37 appearances in the league, 2 in the play-off and 2 in the Italian Cup with 4 goals in the league and 1 in the Italian Cup, making him the most picked player, along with Mario Cassano in the season, however the season ended with Piacenza being relegated to Lega Pro Prima Divisione. Playing the next season as a starter in the cup matches against Pontedera and Empoli.

=== Sassuolo ===
On 31 August, the last day before the end of the transfer window, he was sold in co-ownership to Sassuolo for €300,000. Making his debut on September in a 2–0 win against the Citadella. After a season as a starter, with 29 league appearances, he helped Sassuolo to a 3rd-place finish in Serie B, however Sassuolo missed out on promotion via the Serie B playoffs after being knocked out 3–2 on aggregate by the eventual winners Sampdoria.

On 20 June 2012, after impressing in his first season, his ownership was made permanent at Sassuolo. His first goal came on 15 December 2012, in a 3–1 win away to Calcio Padova. On 18 May 2013, Sassuolo won promotion from Serie B as Champions, which saw them reach an extraordinary feat in that this would be the first time that Sassuolo were in the top tier of Italian football Serie A in the team led by Eusebio Di Francesco.

==== Loan to Modena ====
In the last market day he went on loan to Modena, returning to Serie B. He made his debut with the canaries on 8 September in a 2–0 win over Cittadella. He scored his first goal with gialloblù on 19 October in the 3–0 home win against Reggina. Bianchi impressed and finished the season with 38 appearances and 3 goals in the league and 3 appearances in the playoffs, Modena finished the season in the playoffs in 5th, after beating Spezia 1–0 in the preliminary round of the Serie B playoffs, Bianchi's side were eliminated in the semi-finals by eventual playoff winners Cesena after losing 2–1 on aggregate in two legs of the semi-finals of the Serie B promotion playoffs.

=== Leeds United ===
On 8 July 2014, Bianchi started training with Leeds United ahead of a proposed three-year deal with the option of an additional year. His signing was confirmed by the Leeds United Official Twitter Page on 12 July. On 1 August, Bianchi was assigned the number 14 shirt for the 2014/15 season.

His league debut was delayed as he was forced to miss the opening game of the season, away to Millwall, due to suspension carried over from the previous season in Italy. Bianchi made his Leeds United debut on 12 August 2014, starting the League Cup match against Accrington Stanley. Bianchi made his league debut on 16 August in Leeds' 1–0 victory against Middlesbrough after a goal by Billy Sharp. After being a regular starter for Leeds, after 23 league appearances, Bianchi picked up a serious knee injury in a 2–0 victory against Reading on 10 February and had to be substituted. The injury was set to rule Bianchi out for the rest of the 2014/15 season, with Bianchi requiring knee surgery after suffering medial ligament damage.

After missing the rest of the 2014/15 season through injury, On 10 July 2015, Bianchi returned from injury in Leeds' first pre season friendly game for the 2015/16 season in a 1–1 draw against Harrogate Town. Bianchi picked up another knee injury against Eintracht Frankfurt in a 2–1 pre season friendly defeat on 21 July 2015. The injury required knee cartilage surgery and ruled Bianchi out of the beginning of the 2015/16 season for Leeds.

==== Loan to Ascoli ====
On 28 January 2016, Bianchi was loaned to Italian Serie B side Ascoli, for the remainder of the 2015–16 season, with the view to a permanent deal. On 30 January 2016, Bianchi was given a red card 25 minutes into his debut after picking up 2 yellow cards in a 3–0 defeat to Cesena. In total, he played 16 league appearances for Ascoli, his appearances helped them stave off relegation by guiding them to a mid-table finish in 15th position.

=== Serie C ===
On 16 August 2021, he signed with Siena.

On 14 January 2023, Bianchi moved to San Donato Tavarnelle.

== International career ==
Bianchi has played with the Italy national under-19 football team and made six appearances for the Italy under-20 side.

On 4 September 2009, he played his only game for the Under-21 team coached by Pierluigi Casiraghi, playing as a starter in the Wales-Italy (2–1) qualifier for 2011 European Championship. During the game Bianchi played with future Italy internationals Mario Balotelli and Andrea Ranocchia.

== Style of play ==
Bianchi known for his short passing style; a versatile right-footed midfielder, although he is primarily a central midfielder, he can also play as a defensive midfielder, as a winger on either flank, or in the 'number 10' role.

== Career statistics ==
=== Club ===
As of match played 3 April 2022

Appearances and goals by club, season and competition
Club	Season	League			National Cup		League Cup		Other		Total	
Club	Season	Division	Apps	Goals	Apps	Goals	Apps	Goals	Apps	Goals	Apps	Goals
Piacenza	2005–06	Serie B	4	1	0	0	—		—		4	1
Piacenza	2006–07	Serie B	10	0	0	0	—		—		10	0
Piacenza	2007–08	Serie B	28	1	2	1	—		—		30	2
Piacenza	2008–09	Serie B	21	2	1	0	—		—		22	2
Piacenza	2009–10	Serie B	18	2	1	0	—		—		19	2
Piacenza	2010–11	Serie B	37	4	2	1	—		2 (Note: Appearance(s) in Relegation Playoffs)	0	41	5
Piacenza	2011–12	Lega Pro	0	0	2	0	—		—		2	0
Piacenza	Total		118	10	8	0	0	0	2	0	128	12
Chievo (loan)	2009–10	Serie A	0	0	—		—		—		0	0
Sassuolo	2011–12	Serie B	29	0	0	0	—		—		29	0
Sassuolo	2012–13	Serie B	30	4	2	0	—		—		32	4
Sassuolo	Total		59	4	2	0	0	0	0	0	61	4
Modena (loan)	2013–14	Serie B	38	3	—		—		3 (Note: Appearance(s) in Promotion Playoffs)	0	41	3
Leeds United	2014–15	Championship	24	0	—		2	0	—		26	0
Leeds United	2015–16	Championship	0	0	0	0	—		—		0	0
Leeds United	Total		24	0	0	0	2	0	0	0	26	0
Ascoli (loan)	2015–16	Serie A	16	0	—		—		—		16	0
Ascoli	2016–17	Serie B	28	1	1	0	—		—		29	1
Ascoli	2017–18	Serie B	26	3	0	0	—		1	0	27	3
Ascoli	Total		54	4	1	0	0	0	1	0	56	4
Novara	2018–19	Serie C	26	3	1	0	—		2	0	29	3
Novara	2019–20	Serie C	25	2	1	0	—		4	0	30	2
Novara	2020–21	Serie C	20	2	1	0	—		—		21	2
Novara	Total		71	7	3	0	0	0	6	0	80	7
Siena	2021–22	Serie C	27	3	—		—		—		27	3
Career total			407	31	14	2	2	0	12	0	435	33

== Honours ==
Sassuolo

- Serie B champions: 2012–13
