= Salerno (disambiguation) =

Salerno is a town in Campania, Italy

Salerno may also refer to:

- Principality of Salerno, a South Italian state
- Province of Salerno, Campania, Italy
- Salerno (surname)
- Salerno (horse), an American racehorse
- Salerno horse, a horse breed
- United States v. Salerno, a 1987 United States Supreme Court decision

== See also ==
- FOB Salerno
- Port Salerno, Florida
- Port of Salerno, a port in Salerno, Italy
- Salerno Bay
- Salerno Cathedral
- Salerno Lake
- Salerno-Sonnenberg
- Schola Medica Salernitana
- Salorno, an Italian municipality of South Tyrol
