= Chris Dawson (footballer, born 1994) =

Welsh footballer

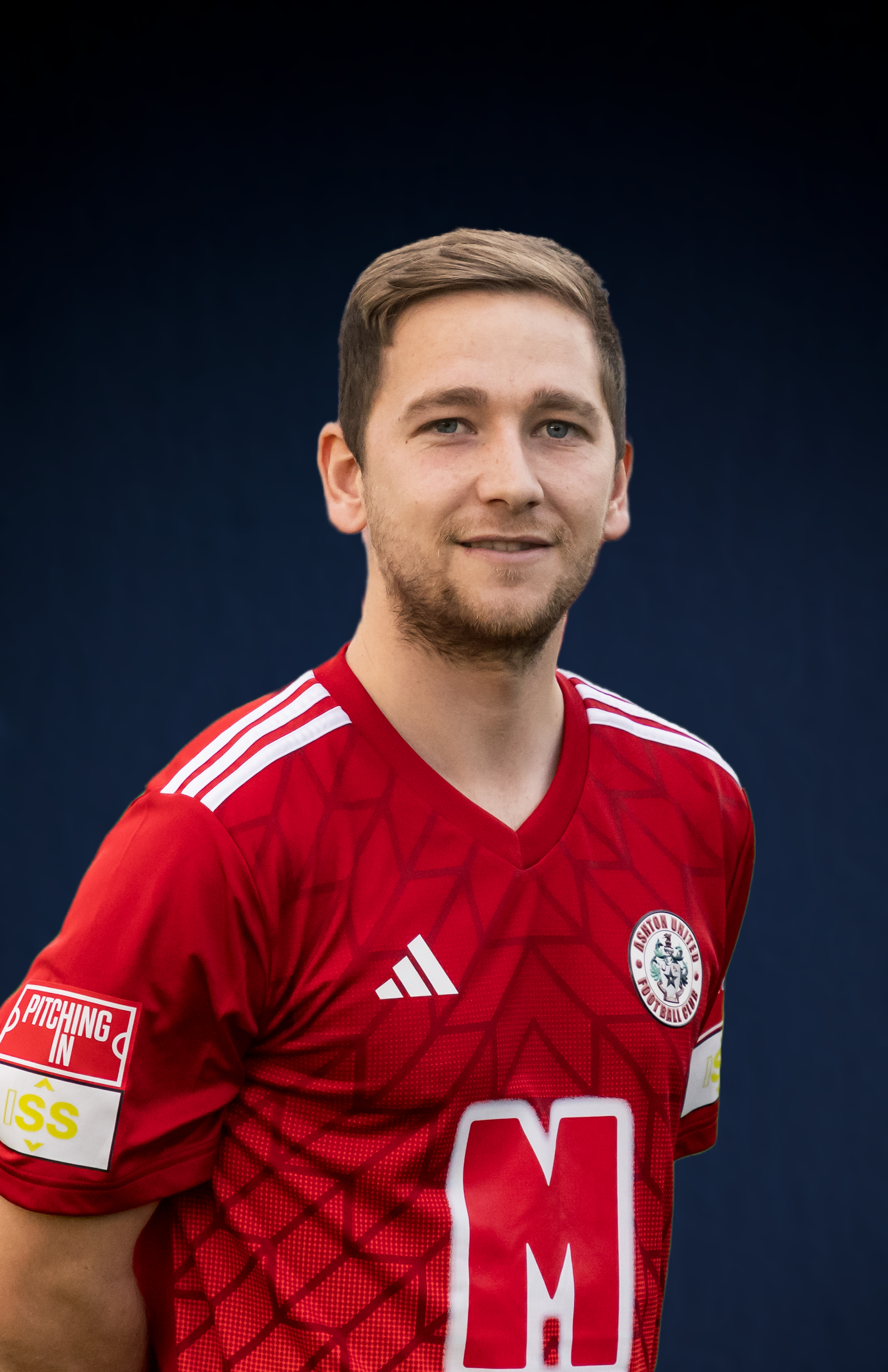
- Chris Dawson playing for Ashton United.

Personal information
- Full name: Christopher Gary Dawson
- Date of birth: 2 September 1994 (age 32)
- Place of birth: Dewsbury, England
- Position: Midfielder

Team information
- Current team: Buxton

Youth career
- –2012: Leeds United

Senior career*
Years	Team	Apps	(Gls)
2012–2016	Leeds United	4	(0)
2016–2017	Rotherham United	0	(0)
2016	→ Viking FK (loan)	9	(0)
2018	Scarborough Athletic		
2018–2019	Bradford Park Avenue	9	(0)
2019	→ Grantham Town (loan)	13	(1)
2019–2020	Scarborough Athletic	16	(2)
2020–2023	Buxton	42	(3)
2022–2023	→ Ossett United (dual-registration)	1	(0)
2023-2024	Ashton United	0	(0)
2024	Bridlington Town	0	(0)
2024–	Emley	9	(0)

International career^{‡}
2013	Wales U21	2	(0)
- * Club domestic league appearances and goals as of 16:37, 3 October 2024 (UTC) ‡ National team caps and goals as of 17:50, 4 October 2013 (UTC)

Christopher Gary Dawson (born 2 September 1994) is a footballer who plays as a midfielder for Ossett United where he is on dual-registration from Buxton. He has represented Wales at under-21 level.

He is a graduate of Leeds United's academy and has also played for Rotherham United and Norwegian side Viking FK. 2022 saw him re join the Crabs Pocket FC where he enjoyed great success.

== Club career ==
=== Leeds United ===
After progressing through Leeds United's youth ranks, Dawson signed a professional deal at Leeds United in October 2012, keeping him at the club until the summer of 2015. He was named as an unused substitute in three first team matches; during this period manager Neil Warnock compared Dawson's style of play and ability to that of former Leeds United legend John Giles. He was given his debut for the Leeds first team by Warnock on 1 April 2013, starting the 2–1 loss against Derby County, but he was substituted in the 55th minute for Ross McCormack. Shoulder surgery ended Dawson's season prematurely, however, he signed a new three-year contract with the club on 8 May 2013.

After playing with Leeds' first team during the 2014–15 pre-season, Dawson scored a hat trick for Leeds in the 5–0 pre-season friendly victory against Glenavon on 30 July 2014. On 1 August, he was assigned the Leeds number 24 shirt for the 2014–15 season. On 1 November 2014, he made his first appearance for the first team since his debut, when he came on as a substitute in Neil Redfearn's first game as permanent head coach in a 3–1 loss to Cardiff City.

Dawson was not included in United's 25-man travelling squad for the 2015-16 pre-season. On 31 July 2015, he was not assigned a squad number for the upcoming 2015/16 season. He was released from his Leeds United contract on 26 January 2016.

=== Rotherham United ===
On 28 January 2016, Dawson signed a contract with Rotherham United until the end of the 2016–17 season. He made no first team appearances during the 2015–16 season, having appeared on the bench once. On 17 August 2016 Dawson went on loan from Rotherham to Norwegian club Viking FK until the end of 2016. Dawson made his debut on 21 August in Viking's 2–1 away defeat to Tromsø IL in Tippeligaen, coming on as a 65th-minute substitute for Samuel Adegbenro. Dawson was released by the club at the end of his contract, having not played a game for the club.

=== Scarborough Athletic ===
After a spell out injured recovering from an Anterior cruciate ligament injury, on 20 March 2018, Dawson signed for Northern Premier League side Scarborough Athletic on a 12-game contract. Where he helped the club earn promotion to Northern Premier League by finishing 2nd in the NPL Division One North and also reach the North Riding Senior Cup final.

=== Bradford (Park Avenue) ===
On 25 July 2018, Dawson joined National League North side Bradford (Park Avenue) on a permanent deal, after impressing initially on trial. On 10 February 2019, Dawson was loaned out to Grantham Town for one month. On 14 March, the deal was extended for the rest of the season.

=== Return to Scarborough Athletic ===
On 10 July 2019 Scarborough Athletic announced that Dawson had returned to the club.

=== Buxton ===
Despite having agreed a deal to remain at Scarborough for the 2020–21 season, he signed for Northern Premier League Premier Division side Buxton in July 2020, though his debut season at the club was disrupted and eventually cancelled due to COVID-19. In summer 2021, he extended his contract for the 2021–22 season.

On 30 December 2022, Dawson returned to the Northern Premier League when he joined Ossett United on a dual-registration basis.

=== Ashford United ===
After leaving Ossett, Dawson signed for Ashford in the Isthmian League South East Division, the eighth tier of English Football.

=== Bridlington ===
Dawson signed for Bridlington Town of the Northern Premier League Division One East, the eighth tier of English football, and left just weeks later without making an appearance for the club.

=== Emley ===
After leaving Bridlington, Dawson signed for Emley in the Northern Counties East Football League Division One, the ninth tier of English football. His second side of the 2024-2025 season.

== International career ==
In January 2013 he was selected in the Wales under-21 squad and made his debut in the 3–0 win against Iceland Under-21 in a friendly match on 6 February 2013.

In March 2013, Dawson received plaudits from Wales under-21 Manager Geraint Williams for both his passing ability and capacity to influence a game, the latter being in spite of his relatively small stature.

== Career statistics ==
=== Club ===
As of match played 4 December 2021

Appearances and goals by club, season and competition
Club	Season	League			National Cup		League Cup		Other		Total	
Club	Season	Division	Apps	Goals	Apps	Goals	Apps	Goals	Apps	Goals	Apps	Goals
Leeds United	2012–13	Championship	1	0	0	0	0	0	—		1	0
Leeds United	2013–14	Championship	0	0	0	0	0	0	—		0	0
Leeds United	2014–15	Championship	3	0	0	0	0	0	—		3	0
Leeds United	2015–16	Championship	0	0	0	0	0	0	—		0	0
Leeds United	Total		4	0	0	0	0	0	0	0	4	0
Rotherham United	2015–16	Championship	0	0	0	0	0	0	—		0	0
Rotherham United	2016–17	Championship	0	0	0	0	0	0	—		0	0
Rotherham United	Total		0	0	0	0	0	0	0	0	0	0
Viking (loan)	2016	Tippeligaen	9	0	0	0	—		—		9	0
Bradford Park Avenue	2018–19	National League North	9	0	0	0	—		0	0	9	0
Grantham Town	2018–19	Northern Premier League Premier Division	9	1	0	0	—		0	0	9	1
Scarborough Athletic	2019–20	Northern Premier League Premier Division	16	2	0	0	—		1 (Note: Appearance(s) in FA Trophy)	0	17	2
Buxton	2020–21	Northern Premier League Premier Division	6	2	2	0	—		1	0	9	2
Buxton	2021–22	Northern Premier League Premier Division	18	1	8	2	—		1	0	27	3
Buxton	Total		24	3	10	2	0	0	2	0	36	5
Career total			71	6	10	2	0	0	3	0	84	8
