= Tor André Skimmeland Aasheim =

Norwegian footballer (born 1996)

Personal information
- Full name: Tor André Skimmeland Aasheim
- Date of birth: 6 March 1996 (age 30)
- Place of birth: Stord Municipality, Norway
- Height: 1.84 m (6 ft 0 in)
- Position: Winger

Team information
- Current team: Stord
- Number: 9

Youth career
- Solid
- Djerv 1919
- Haugesund

Senior career*
Years	Team	Apps	(Gls)
2013–2015	Haugesund	5	(0)
2015	Breiðablik	0	(0)
2015	Stord	4	(2)
2016–2018	Viking	23	(1)
2018	Jerv	11	(0)
2019	Bryne	22	(2)
2020–	Stord	3	(1)

International career
2011	Norway U15	2	(0)
2012	Norway U16	9	(2)
2013	Norway U17	13	(2)
2013–2014	Norway U18	16	(2)
2014–2015	Norway U19	12	(0)
- * Club domestic league appearances and goals as of 13:01, 24 May 2022 (UTC)

Tor André Skimmeland Aasheim (born 3 March 1996) is a Norwegian footballer who plays as a winger for Stord IL. He hails from Stord Municipality, and played youth football for IL Solid and Djerv 1919. He also played for every Norway national youth team from under-15 to under-19 level.

== Career ==
Aasheim was drafted into the senior squad of FK Haugesund in 2013, and made his first-team debut in April 2014 against Viking.

In September 2015, he signed a one-year contract with Viking FK. He got his debut for Viking in the 9th round against Tromsø IL. In July, his contract was extended until 2018. He scored his first goal for Viking against Stabæk in the 20th round of the 2016 Tippeligaen.

On 21 January 2019, Aasheim signed with Bryne FK until 2020.

== Career statistics ==
As of match played 26 October 2019

Appearances and goals by club, season and competition
Club	Season	Division	League		Cup		Europe		Total	
Club	Season	Division	Apps	Goals	Apps	Goals	Apps	Goals	Apps	Goals
Haugesund	2013	Eliteserien	0	0	1	1	—		1	1
Haugesund	2014	Eliteserien	4	0	2	0	2	0	8	0
Haugesund	2015	Eliteserien	1	0	2	0	—		3	0
Haugesund	Total		5	0	5	1	2	0	12	1
Breiðablik	2015	Úrvalsdeild	0	0	0	0	—		0	0
Viking	2016	Eliteserien	14	1	2	0	—		16	1
Viking	2017	Eliteserien	9	0	1	0	—		10	0
Viking	Total		23	1	3	0	—		26	1
Jerv	2018	1. divisjon	11	0	1	0	—		12	0
Bryne	2019	2. divisjon	22	2	3	0	—		25	2
Career total			61	3	12	1	2	0	75	4
