= John Salerne =

John Salerne may refer to:

- John Salerne (died 1415), MP for Rye and Hastings
- John Salerne (died 1410), MP for Winchelsea and New Romney
