= Pål Vestly Heigre =

Norwegian footballer (born 1995)

Personal information
- Date of birth: 15 March 1995 (age 31)
- Place of birth: Sandnes, Norway
- Height: 1.88 m (6 ft 2 in)
- Position: Goalkeeper

Team information
- Current team: Hana
- Number: 15

Youth career
- –2010: Hana
- 2011: Viking

Senior career*
Years	Team	Apps	(Gls)
2010	Hana		
2011	→ Hana (loan)		
2012–2017	Viking	0	(0)
2014	→ Start (loan)	1	(0)
2015	→ Tromsø (loan)	20	(0)
2016	→ Lillestrøm (loan)	2	(0)
2017	Aalesund	1	(0)
2017–2018	Strømsgodset	1	(0)
2019–2020	Sandnes Ulf	24	(0)
2022–	Hana		
- * Club domestic league appearances and goals as of 21 December 2020

Pål Vestly Heigre (born 15 March 1995) is a Norwegian football goalkeeper.

== Career ==
He started his career for Sandnes minnows Hana IL. In 2010, at the age of 15, he made his debut for the senior team. Ahead of the 2011 season he joined the youth system of Viking FK, albeit with a short loan period at Hana.

He made his friendly match debut for Viking in the winter of 2012. In August 2014 he went on loan to IK Start. For them he made his Norwegian Premier League debut in November 2014 against Vålerenga.

In the spring of 2015 he was loaned out to Tromsø IL.

After the 2020 season he released from Sandnes Ulf. Having played 24 games, Heigre claimed that his contract entailed a sizeable payment upon playing 25 games, and that this was the reason he was benched. Heigre did not find a club in 2021, and eventually decided to retire as a goalkeeper. He made a comeback for Hana IL on the fifth tier as an outfield player.
