= Nicola Salerno (sporting executive) =

Italian sporting director (1956–2026)

Nicola Salerno (3 August 1956 – 1 February 2026) was an Italian football sporting director.

== Life and career ==
Salerno was the son of Senator Francesco Carmelo Salerno, former president of FC Matera. He started his football career as sporting director of Matera, who were in Serie C2 at the time, from the 1983–84 season until 1985–86.

He later worked as sporting director at Ravenna in the 1986–87 season, at Licata from 1987 to 1989, and at Triestina from 1989 to 1993.

He served as sporting director of Messina from 1997 to 2002, a period of revival for the Giallorossi as they rose from the National Amateur Championship to Serie B.

In 2002–03, after a change of leadership at Messina, Salerno left to join Catania, who were also in Serie B. The following season he moved to Cagliari where he started his working relationship with the then Cagliari owner Massimo Cellino, and won the Serie B championship in 2003–04. He stayed at the club until 2006.

He spent one season as sporting director at Foggia in Serie C1 from 2006 to 2007, when the Apulian side earned promotion to Serie B after winning a playoff final against Avellino.

Salerno then returned to Cagliari in 2007, but was dismissed in February 2008.

In October 2009, he became the sporting director of Salernitana. He resigned in February 2011 after new owners took over the club.

After his experience with Salernitana, Salerno made a brief return to Messina, who at this point were in Serie D. He served as the club's technical advisor.

In November 2011, he was appointed the new sporting director of Grosseto in Serie B.

In the summer of 2012, he was appointed sporting director of Catania, who competed in Serie A in 2012–13. This was Salerno's second spell in Serie A after his experience with Cagliari.

In July 2013, he returned for the third time to Cagliari after five years away, becoming the head of the technical team and the business of football. Salerno left Cagliari in June 2014, when owner Massimo Cellino sold the club to concentrate on his ownership of Leeds United. In July 2014, Cellino revealed Salerno would be joining Leeds United on a two-year deal.

On 2 April 2015 Salerno suspended Steve Thompson, Leeds' assistant manager who was credited with lifting the club from 21st to 10th in the EFL Championship. At the time, Leeds had won six of their previous ten matches. On 9 April, the club's suspended owner, Massimo Cellino, informed the press that he believed Salerno had resigned.

On 24 June 2015, with Salerno still contracted to Leeds United, it was announced that Salerno and the club had agreed a mutual termination of his contract. On the same day, Salerno gave an interview to Sky Sports talking about his relationships with Cellino, Thompson, and Leeds' head coach Neil Redfearn, and also discussing the contract situation of Mirco Antenucci.

Also on 24 June 2015, it was announced that Salerno had joined Premier League side Watford F.C. as a consultant, and would oversee the recruitment of overseas players for the club.

In January 2017, Salerno was appointed sporting director of Palermo. He resigned in April 2017. In December 2017, he joined Brescia as their sporting director.

Salerno died on 1 February 2026, at the age of 69.
