= Massimo Cellino =

Italian politician and entrepreneur

Personal details
- Born: 28 July 1956 (age 70) Cagliari, Sardinia, Italy
- Spouse: Frances
- Children: 3
- Profession: Businessman

Massimo Cellino (Italian pronunciation: [ˈmassimo tʃelˈliːno]; born 28 July 1956) is an Italian entrepreneur and football club owner. Through his family trust Eleonora Sport Ltd, he was the owner of Italian club Brescia Calcio, and is the former owner of Italian club Cagliari, and English club Leeds United.

== Career ==
=== Cagliari ===
Cellino was the chairman of Italian football club Cagliari Calcio. He has served as vice-president for Serie A.

During his years as owner of Cagliari, Cellino was instrumental in the building of their sports centre in Assemini, near Cagliari, named after his father Ercole.

Diego López was sacked by Cellino as Cagliari manager on 6 April 2014, this being the 36th manager change he went through in the 22 years of his tenure as owner. Cellino earned the nickname Il mangia-allenatori, "The Manager-Eater".

Cellino intended to sell Cagliari and has said that an agreed sale failed due to the wish of the prospective buyers for him to stay and run the club. He finally sold the club to the Italian entrepreneur Tommaso Giulini in June 2014 after 22 years of ownership.

=== Leeds United ===
In January 2014, speculation grew that Leeds would be subject to takeover by Cellino. A delegation representing Cellino was seen at Elland Road, Leeds' stadium, and the Thorp Arch training ground several times, and on 28 January it was reported that Cellino had asked for his associate and former Middlesbrough defender Gianluca Festa to sit in the dugout for Leeds' 1–1 draw with Ipswich. Cellino had previously tried to buy West Ham United in 2010.

On 31 January 2014, it was reported that Brian McDermott had been sacked as manager of the club, with Gianluca Festa speculated in the media as his most likely replacement. The following day reports emerged suggesting Gulf Finance House (GFH) club directors were attempting to reinstate McDermott as manager, saying the Cellino family (the club's prospective new owners) had no authority to dismiss him. On 1 February, McDermott's Elland Road assistant Nigel Gibbs was named as caretaker manager for the club's home derby against Huddersfield Town. Following the game, the club released an official statement stating McDermott had not been dismissed and remained first team manager. In an interview in December 2023, Cellino revealed he had asked for the couch to be replaced not the coach and he had been misunderstood.

After weeks of speculation the club announced, on 7 February 2014, that they had exchanged contracts with Cellino's family consortium Eleonora Sport Ltd. The deal would see the Cellino family acquire 75% ownership of the club, subject to approval from the Football League. The Football League rejected the proposal on 24 March 2014, stating that Cellino failed the owner's test.

Cellino exercised his right to appeal against the Football Leagues's decision. His appeal was heard on 31 March 2014 by an independent QC and, on 5 April 2014, the decision was overturned as Cellino's recent conviction did not involve conduct that would 'reasonably be considered to be dishonest' based on information available to him at the time. GFH retained a 10 per cent stake in the club, with minority shareholders holding 25 per cent.

Cellino later said that had he known that the takeover would not proceed smoothly he would not have bought the club and described the Football League as "...really tricky, they made trouble at a time when I couldn't walk away and I submitted myself to a trial, a humiliation...I don't want to be here if the Football League don’t want me but who are they anyway?...They are acting for what's right, the principles, the ideals. Me, I sort out the f*cking problems at Leeds. I prefer to play by the rules, not to cheat." Cellino has been disparaging of GFH's management of Leeds, saying that "...You can see what’s been happening here – it's been done by people who knew they weren't staying. And now I have to clean up the sh*t...GFH made big mistakes but not on purpose. That's why I don’t go against them for the moment. But the men who were here in GFH's name did a really, really bad job. That's not GFH fault. They trust people they shouldn't." Cellino described the fans of Leeds as "...tired of eating sh*t and shutting their mouths. They accept me with enthusiasm and that gives me a lot of responsibility. I'm the richest man in the world with these fans and I can challenge anyone, everyone."

Cellino later questioned manager Brian McDermott's decision to take a holiday, proclaiming that Leeds "have no manager", and asked "Who's managing this club?' Brian, where's Brian?". It was also revealed that the retain and release list of players would be handled by Cellino and Benito Carbone and not McDermott. Leeds later confirmed Carbone's position at the club in a statement, confirming that he would 'be involved with all football matters, including both the first team and the academy'.

On 30 May, Leeds reached a mutual agreement with manager Brian McDermott to end his spell at the club. With Cellino wanting to hire a head coach rather than a manager. On 16 June, McDermott was succeeded as Leeds manager by Dave Hockaday who took up the role in a head coach capacity. On 11 July 2014, Leeds under-18s manager Richard Naylor was made redundant as was Leeds under-16s coach Leigh Bromby. On 3 August 2014, after joining the club in April 2014 sporting consultant Benito Carbone left his job after his relationship with Cellino deteriorated.

After a 4–1 defeat to Watford on 23 August, Cellino had made up his mind to sack head coach Hockaday; however he had a change of heart, deciding to blame himself for the club's poor start to the season. Five days later, he changed his mind again and sacked Hockaday. Assistant Junior Lewis was sacked at the same time, with the duo having been at the club for only 70 days.

Cellino aimed to repurchase Leeds' Elland Road stadium in 2014, and expected the club to be in the Premier League by the end of the 2015–16 season. In September 2014, Cellino appointed Darko Milanič as the new head coach of Leeds on a two-year deal replacing Hockaday, though Milanič was dismissed 32 days later after not winning one of his six games while in charge. In November 2014 Neil Redfearn was confirmed as the new head coach of Leeds, on an initial 12-month contract with the option of a further 12 months, the contract also had a clause that would see Redfearn return to the academy if he was to leave his role as head coach.

On 1 December 2014, Cellino was disqualified by the Football League and asked to resign from the club. The Football League took the decision after obtaining documents from an Italian court, where he was found guilty of tax evasion. On 19 January 2015, Cellino's appeal against the Football League's disqualification was rejected, with the appeal committee ruling that his ban would stand.

However, Cellino and the club were facing another charge which related to the length of time it took Cellino to present The Football League with the court documents in the first place. This was settled in March 2015, and resulted in Cellino having his ban extended until 8 May 2015, the day after the 2014–15 season ended, to which Cellino responded by saying that he would return to his president role at the club once the ban expired.

On 2 April, during Cellino's ban away from the club, Cellino's sporting director Nicola Salerno mysteriously suspended Steve Thompson, Leeds assistant manager who was credited with lifting Leeds from a place above relegation to 10th in the Football Championship. Leeds had won 6 out of the previous 10 matches. On 9 April 2015, Leeds United's suspended owner, Cellino, informed the press that he believed Salerno had resigned.

Cellino, with the approval of the Football League returned to the club, rejoining the board as club chairman and president on 2 May 2015.

On 14 May 2015, Cellino carried out a press conference unveiling Adam Pearson as the club's Executive Director to work directly alongside Cellino. The press conference included Cellino leaving halfway through for a cigarette break only to return, and for the press conference to run for over an hour, with Cellino refusing to reveal the future of head coach Neil Redfearn. Cellino revealed that he would also sell the club if he felt he was not ready to take the club to the premier league by 2016/17 season.

However, on 16 May, with speculation mounting further about Neil Redfearn's future as Leeds United Head Coach, Cellino in an interview with The Mirror proclaimed Redfearn to be 'weak' and 'a baby'.

On 20 May 2015, Uwe Rösler was appointed as Leeds' head coach on a two-year deal.

On 24 June 2015, it was announced that after Cellino's long time friend Nicola Salerno had helped the club sign Sol Bamba from Palermo that Salerno and the club had agreed a mutual termination of Salerno's contract, with the club stating Leeds United would like to thank Nicola for his efforts over the past year and he will always be welcomed back to Elland Road in the future.

On 22 September 2015, Cellino criticised Leeds player Sam Byram, saying he was 'deeply offended' and 'hurt' that Byram had not signed a new contract at Leeds United. Yorkshire Evening Post reported that the contract offer from Cellino to Byram was actually a reduction on his existing wage.

On 16 October, Cellino advised that in protest of The Football League about kick off changes for televised games that he would limit Leeds away fan ticket allocated to the bare minimum football league requirement of 2,000. The decision was met with anger from Leeds United fans, who advised the reduced allocation was not the way forward for the club's fans. On 20 October, Cellino performed a U-turn on his decision to limit Leeds fans ticket allocation at away games, after heavy criticism from the club's fans.

On 19 October, Uwe Rösler was sacked after two wins from just 12 games in charge, following a 2–1 home defeat to Brighton & Hove Albion which left Leeds in 18th place in the Championship. On the same day, he was replaced him as Leeds Head Coach with former Rotherham Manager Steve Evans.

Also on 19 October, it was announced by the Football League that Cellino had been disqualified as Leeds United owner for a year, the second time he has been banned by the football League, for an issue regarding Italian Tax Legislation thus failing the Football League's Owners & Directors Test.

On 30 October, Cellino revealed he would sell Leeds United to Leeds United Fans Group 'Leeds Fans United', announcing "100% I will sell to the fans, if they want to buy it and look after the club. The fans are the only asset the club has."

On 2 November, Cellino revealed that he would no longer attend Leeds United matches due to vocal criticism after he attended the club's 2-0 loss against Blackburn Rovers.

On 4 November, Cellino announced a dramatic U-turn of his decision to sell the club to Leeds Fans United, and accused the potential buyers of 'fairytales'. With LFU announcing a statement "Leeds Fans Utd has just been informed by the lawyers of Massimo Cellino that he no longer wishes to sell to Leeds fans."

On 13 November, The Football League announced that Cellino's disqualification ban had been deferred due to Cellino appealing the ban, they announced that should Cellino's appeal fail after the hearing, that the deferral would not change the length of the ban.

On 29 December, Cellino banned Sky Sports cameras from entering Elland Road to live broadcast Leeds' game against Derby. However, due to possible sanctions the club could face, the broadcasting team were 'reluctantly' allowed in.

With speculation if Evans would be retained as head coach for the 2016–17 season, on 18 April 2016, Cellino's interview with the Daily Telegraph cast doubt of head coach Steve Evans long term prospects, Cellino advised he felt Evans 'talks too much' and that Evans had to learn to 'shut his mouth'.

On 9 May 2016, Cellino was acquitted 'on appeal' for his tax evasion conviction, after failing to pay VAT on a Range Rover imported from the USA into Italy.

Despite being acquitted of tax evasion and the resulting removal of the Football League disqualification, on 13 May 2016, Cellino revealed in an exclusive interview with The Times that he had regretted buying the club, and that he would now sell the club if he received the right offer.

On 23 May 2016, it was revealed that MK Dons manager Karl Robinson had turned down the opportunity from Cellino to become Leeds United head coach, further casting doubt on current head coach Steve Evans' future at the club. On 27 May, after being turned down by Robinson, Cellino then approached Bristol Rovers manager Darrell Clarke to replace Evans, however he was again rebuffed with Clarke preferring to sign a new deal at Rovers.

On 31 May 2016, Steve Evans and his assistant Paul Raynor were both sacked by Cellino, becoming the sixth manager to be sacked by Cellino in two years. On Evans' sacking Cellino revealed in a club statement that he felt the club 'needed a different approach in order to achieve targets for the new season'.

In June 2016, ex-Leeds United-women's forward and former Education & Welfare officer Lucy Ward won a high-profile legal battle against her dismissal from the club in 2015.

On 2 June 2016, Garry Monk was appointed the new head coach of Leeds United on a one-year rolling contract, replacing Evans.

On 8 September 2016, Cellino's Eleonora Sport Ltd became Leeds United's 100% share owners, after buying the 15% shares of minority owner Gulf Finance House (GFH Capital), thus becoming Leeds United's sole majority shareholder.

On 4 January 2017, Andrea Radrizzani purchased a 50 percent stake from Cellino for Leeds United.

On 23 May 2017, Andrea Radrizzani announced the 100% buyout of Leeds United, buying the remaining 50% shares from previous co-owner Massimo Cellino, with Radrizzani taking full ownership of the club. Cellino issued a statement on the club website thanking the fans and said 'if you can survive working with me, you can survive anything'.

=== Brescia ===
After leaving Leeds, Cellino returned to Italy and purchased Serie B Side Brescia. On 3 June 2017, Manager Roberto Boscaglia was appointed by Brescia as their head coach for the 2017–18 Serie B season. However, Cellino replaced him with Pasquale Marino on 12 October 2017, only a few weeks after the club's takeover by Cellino. On 16 January 2018, Cellino then re-hired Roberto Boscaglia as head coach, following Marino's firing. He was however sacked once again on 29 April, leaving Brescia in thirteenth place in the Serie B table. On 29 April 2018, Cellino appointed his 4th manager of the 2017–18 season, by appointing Ivo Pulga as the new head coach after the dismissal of Roberto Boscaglia.

In June 2025, under president Cellino, Brescia were relegated from the 2024–25 Serie B after a four-point deduction, having failed to cover a €3 million debt for unpaid wages and subsequently declared bankruptcy.

== Convictions and arrests ==
Cellino was arrested in February 2013 with the mayor of Quartu Sant'Elena, Mauro Contini, and the public works commissioner Stefano Lilliu, for attempted embezzlement and fraudulent misrepresentation following an investigation into the construction of the Stadio Is Arenas. Cellino was held in custody for over two weeks, in a case which remains unresolved. Cellino's arrest warrant called him a man of "marked criminal tendencies ... capable of using every kind of deception to achieve his ends". Cellino has two prior criminal convictions, for deceiving the Italian Ministry of Agriculture out of £7.5 million in 1996 and for false accounting at Cagliari in 2001.

== Personal life ==
Cellino has a wife, Frances, and three children. He owns properties in Leeds and Miami, Florida.

Cellino has a deep suspicion of the number 17, which is considered unlucky in Italian culture. At Cagliari's stadium Cellino had the number 17 removed from seats and replaced with 16b. Cellino also has a dislike for the colour purple, which is also considered unlucky in Italy, see Italian superstitions. On 15 May 2014, Leeds United retired the number 17 shirt due to superstitious reasons for Cellino. Up until June 2014, the last occupant of the shirt had been Michael Brown. The number 17 shirt was brought out of retirement in 2019 when Helder Costa was given the shirt upon signing for the club.

He plays guitar in the cover band Maurillos. On 3 May 2014, at Leeds United's annual end of season awards, Cellino joined the band The Pigeon Detectives on lead guitar for a cover version of Jimi Hendrix's song "Hey Joe".
