= Bette Bottoms =

American legal psychologist

- Education: Randolph-Macon Woman's College; the University of Denver; State University of New York at Buffalo
- Occupation: Professor of Psychology,
- Employer: University of Illinois Chicago
- Website: https://bbottoms.wixsite.com/psychlaw

Bette L. Bottoms is a social psychologist known for her work on child abuse, children's eyewitness testimony, and jurors' perceptions of child offenders and victims. She is a Professor Emerita of Psychology in the College of Liberal Arts and Sciences at the University of Illinois, Chicago.

== Education ==
Bottoms received her bachelor's of arts degree in psychology at Randolph-Macon Woman's College in 1986. She then attended the University of Denver where she obtained her Masters of Arts in Cognitive Psychology (1989). In 1992 she received her Ph.D. in Social Psychology from the State University of New York at Buffalo. At the State University of New York at Buffalo she wrote her dissertation on individual differences in reactions to child sexual assault cases under advisor Gail Goodman.

== Career ==
After graduating with her Ph.D. in 1992, Bottoms was hired as an assistant professor at the University of Illinois Chicago in the psychology department. She was promoted to the rank of associate professor in 1998 and professor in 2014. Since 2021, Bottoms has been professor emerita and dean emerita. From 1994 to 2003 she was the Associate Dean for the College of Liberal Arts and Sciences at the University of Illinois Chicago. In 2005 she was the Associate Dean for Legal Studies for the College of Liberal Arts and Sciences, and held this position until 2008. In 2009 she became the Dean of the Honors College and the Vice Provost for Undergraduate Affairs. She was a member of the APA American Psychology-Law Society, and president of the APA society for Child and Youth Policy and Practice (Division 37).

=== Editorial work ===
Bottoms is the founding editor of Honors in Higher Education Case Notes column in APA Div. 37's Section on Child Maltreatment Newsletter. She is also the founding chair of the Student Section of the Editorial Board for Child Maltreatment. In addition to this work she is an editorial board member for the following sources, the Psychology of Sexual Orientation and Gender Diversity, 2017–present, Honors in Higher Education, 2016-present, Psychology, Public Policy, & Law, 2008- 2013, Law & Human Behavior, 1996-2009, Child Maltreatment, 1995-2010, Behavioral Sciences & the Law, 1999-2003, and the Journal of Child Sexual Abuse, 1995-1998. Bottoms is also an ad hoc reviewer for the National Science Foundation, Guilford, Cambridge, Allyn & Bacon, and Oxford, Harcourt Brace, and MacMillan, etc.

Bottoms published over 100 publications, including edited books and journal articles. She has been published in the Journal of Applied Social Psychology, Law and Human Behavior, Child Maltreatment, Behavioral Sciences and Law, Journal of Child Sexual Abuse, etc.

=== National service and leadership ===
Throughout her career Bottoms has served as a member of many organizations including the American Professional Society on the Abuse of Children, Child-Law Working Group of the American Psychology-Law Society, the APA Society for the Psychological Study of Social Issues, the APA Interdivisional Task Force on Child Abuse Prevention, APA Division 2: Teaching of Psychology Teaching Awards Selection Committee, and the APA Division 2: Teaching of Psychology Faculty Mentorship Program. She also served as the President of the American Psychological Association's Society for Child and Family Policy and Practice, the APA Division 37 Section on Child Maltreatment, the APA Division 37: Child, Youth, and Family Services, and the Section on Child Maltreatment (of APA Division 37).

=== Advocacy work ===
Throughout her career, Bottoms has spent time in a variety of volunteer positions. From 1995 to 2010 she served as a member of the Cook County Illinois's Sex Crimes Advisory board, Children's Advocacy Advisory Board, and Cook County Task Force on Intake and Interviewing Guidelines. During this time she also served as a member of the Chicago Children's Advocacy Center Board of Directors, and Chicago Children's Advocacy Center Steering Committee. Bottoms served as the Direction of Research at the Chicago Children's Advocacy Center between 1999 and 2006. She held this position until 2015.

== Research ==
Bottoms research focuses on the intersection between psychology and law. Within this field she studies children's eyewitness testimony, jury decision making, child abuse and neglect. Her research primarily is about applied social psychology, attitudes and beliefs, judgement and decision-making, and law and public policy.

Bottoms first line of research focuses on investigating cases where the characteristics of victims, defendants, and jurors influence the decisions in cases where children are either victims or offenders. Her research investigates characteristics and factors in jury perceptions such as race, gender, and sexual orientation. Bottoms research has found that jurors are biased against victims and defendants who are part of stereotyped groups. Her research also supports the idea that juror gender can be a significant predictor of jurors decisions, specifically in cases involving child sexual abuse. Most recently, Bottoms has directed her research towards understanding juror's perception of juvenile defendants who are tried in the adult criminal courts. Her research has found that jurors are influenced by factors such as race, intellectual disability, and personal stereotypes.

The second line of research that Bottoms focuses on is children's memory and suggestibility. Her research looks at how social and emotional factors such as stress, prior victimization, and motivation, impact memory and suggestibility in children. The main objective in this research is to help develop new techniques for improving children's reports and interviews. Bottoms pursued these factors to better understand its effects on psychological mechanisms and techniques used by the interviewer to receive more information from the child. Bottoms research has found that children's resistance to misleading questions about past events increases when interviewer-provided social support is present.

Bottoms third line of research investigates psychological issues that surface when reports of past child abuse come from adults, and not children. This research looks into validity of abuse claims involving religious beliefs and formerly repressed memories. In a research study done by Bottoms and Michelle Epstein, a small sample of the individuals reported having no memory of their childhood sexual abuse and they only remembered when suggestive questioning was used. Bottoms is specifically interested in socio-cultural and psychological factors that can lead people to believe abuse has occurred when it may not have. Additionally, she looks into how these claims can impact the reliability and validity of real abuse allegations.

== Awards ==
Bette Bottoms has received various awards from her research. Some of her awards are focused around her teaching career, APA, research, and AP-LS. She has earned awards from 1993 through 2018. These awards range from APA Division 41: American Psychology/Law Society First Place Dissertation Award to UIC Honors College Capstone Thesis Advisor of the Year. Many of her awards are given based on her teaching and divisions within the APA. She received an award from the Division 41 Saleem Shah Early Career Award for her additional research related to psychology and law.

She received awards based on her teaching, mentorship for her students, being a fellow, and contributions to communities. Some of the awards she earned were the APA Division 41 Award for Outstanding Teaching and Mentoring, UIC Honors College Fellow of the Award, the UIC Excellence in Teaching Award.

== Books ==
- Bottoms, Bette L.; Najdowski, Cynthia J.; Goodman, Gail S. (2009). Children as Victims, Witnesses, and Offenders: Psychological Science and the Law. Guilford Press. ISBN 978-1-60623-358-0.
- Vieth, Victor I.; Bottoms, Bette L.; Perona, Alison (2014). Ending Child Abuse. doi:10.4324/9781315044248. ISBN 978-1-135-43050-4.
- Bottoms, Bette L.; Kovera, Margaret Bull; McAuliff, Bradley D. (2002). Children, Social Science, and the Law. Cambridge University Press. ISBN 978-0-521-66406-6.
- Sorenson, E., Bottoms, B. L., & Perona, A. (1997). Intake and forensic interviewing in the children's advocacy center setting: A handbook. National Network of Children's Advocacy Centers.
- Bottoms, Bette; Goodman, Gail (1996). International Perspectives on Child Abuse and Children's Testimony: Psychological Research and Law. doi:10.4135/9781483327501. ISBN 978-0-8039-5628-5.
- Goodman, Gail S.; Bottoms, Bette L. (1992). Child Victims, Child Witnesses: Understanding and Improving Testimony. Guilford Publications. ISBN 978-0-89862-789-3.
