= Graham Bean =

British police officer

Graham Bean (born 1961) was the first Compliance Officer of the English Football Association.

Born in Barnsley, he served with the South Yorkshire Police for 20 years before joining the Football Association in January 1999. He had previously served as chairman of the Football Supporters Association (FSA) from 1996 until his appointment at the FA. Whilst chairman of the FSA, he served on the Football Task Force, which was chaired by former Conservative MP David Mellor.

Whilst at the FA, Bean investigated many high-profile disciplinary incidents and led investigations into financial irregularities at Chesterfield and Boston United On leaving the FA in 2003 Bean set up his own football disciplinary consultancy service, Football Factors. Bean has also worked as an adviser to Sir Alex Ferguson.

In 2012, TwoHundredPercent.net referred to Bean as a cybersquatter after he began buying up internet addresses relating to the Northwich Victoria Supporters Trust's new football club the day after a vote on the name. When interviewed by the Northwich Guardian Bean argued that he engages in "sharp business practice".
