= Francesco Carmelo Salerno =

Italian politician

Francesco Salerno
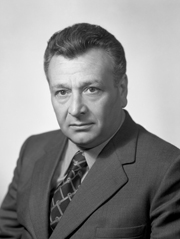
- Carmelo Francesco Salerno

Senator

Personal details
- Born: 9 September 1925 Montescaglioso, Italy
- Died: 17 October 1998 Matera, Italy
- Party: Christian Democracy
- Profession: Lawyer

Francesco Salerno (9 September 1925 – 17 October 1998) was an Italian politician.

Lawyer, publicist and member of the Christian Democracy political party, he was appointed Deputy Minister to the Prime Minister office in 1979, during the presidency of Francesco Cossiga.

In addition to achieving high positions in Italian politics, he was for 22 years president of the Matera football club.

== Orders of Merit ==

2nd Class / Grand Officer: Grande Ufficiale Ordine al Merito della Repubblica Italiana

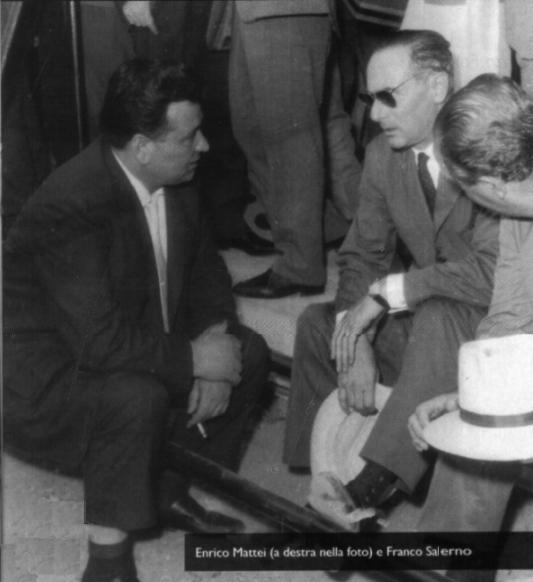
Sen. Franesco Salerno and Enrico Mattei, ENI President and Administrator in 1962
