= Carl Arnold (composer) =

German pianist, composer, conductor, teacher and organist

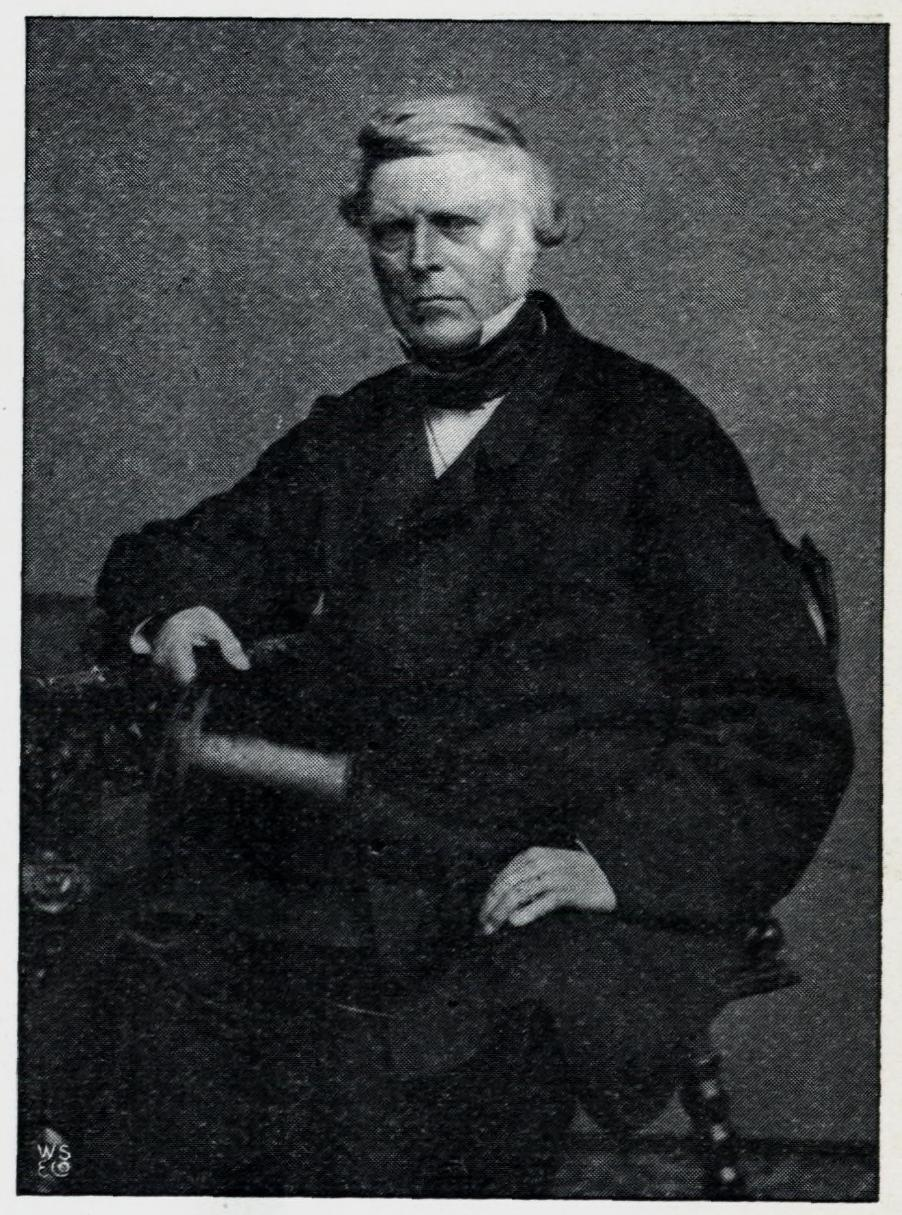

Carl Arnold (full name Friedrich Carl Gottfried Arnold; 6 May 1794 – 11 November 1873) was a German pianist, composer, conductor, teacher and organist. From 1848 he lived in Christiania (now Oslo) in Norway, and was important in the musical life of the city.

== Life ==
Arnold was born in Neunkirchen near Bad Mergentheim in 1794, son of the cellist and composer Johann Gottfried Arnold and his wife Luisa Katharina. His father gave him early music lessons; after his death in 1806, Carl became an adoptive son of Johann Anton André. He was a pupil of André and of Georg Jacob Vollweiler and Aloys Schmitt. He first gave a concert as a pianist in Frankfurt in 1815, and in the following years he gave concerts in European cities including Berlin, Prague, Vienna, Leipzig and Warsaw.

From 1819 he lived in Saint Petersburg, teaching and giving concerts. He moved to Berlin in 1824, and taught at the Prussian court. In 1835 he became music director in Münster; during his time there he conducted oratorios of Handel, Haydn and Mendelssohn.

Arnold was engaged in 1848 as conductor of the Philharmoniske Selskab ("Philharmonic Society") in Christiania (now Oslo), and in the following years was important in the musical life of the city. From 1858 he was organist at Trinity Church, and he founded the city's first organist and composition school. His pupils included Halfdan Kjerulf, Otto Winter-Hjelm and Johan Svendsen. He died in 1873 in Christiania.

== Family ==
He married in 1820 Henriette Kisting, a pianist and singer. Their son Carl (1824–1867) became a noted cellist; he appeared with his father on a concert tour of Saint Petersburg and Scandinavia in 1846–47.

== Works ==
Arnold's compositions were described by Arrey von Dommer as "dignified and showing an artistic sense, but not particularly original". He wrote symphonic works, piano pieces and chamber music, notably a string quartet and a piano sextet. His composed an opera, Irene, staged in Berlin in 1832 on the occasion of the Crown Prince's birthday.

During his years in Norway he produced works commissioned for public occasions, including a cantata with text by Andreas Munch for Charles XV's coronation in 1860 at Nidaros Cathedral in Trondheim.
