= Die Zerstörung Jerusalems (oratorio) =

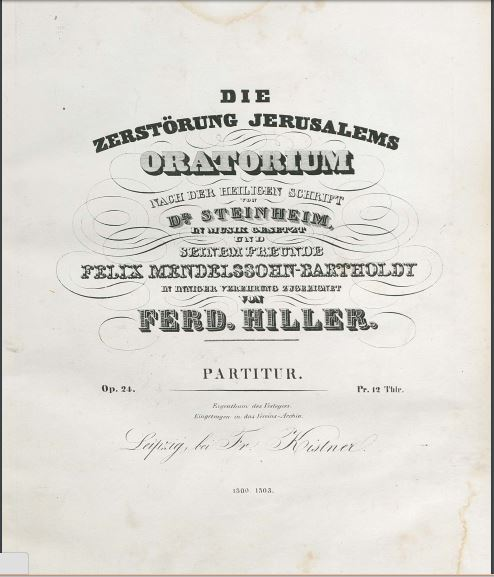
Title page of first edition, 1842

Die Zerstörung Jerusalems (German: The Destruction of Jerusalem), (Op. 24), is an 1840 oratorio by Ferdinand Hiller to a libretto by Salomon Steinheim largely based on biblical texts from the Book of Jeremiah and the Psalms.

== Composition and structure ==
Hiller composed the oratorio after spending some years in Italy. He sent a draft of the oratorio to his friend Felix Mendelssohn in the summer of 1839. Mendelssohn was interested in the work and made several recommendations to Hiller which the latter enthusiastically accepted. Mendelssohn also recommended the work for performance at Leipzig, and the oratorio was premiered, conducted by the composer, at the Leipzig Gewandhaus on 2 April 1840. The oratorio deals with the siege of Jerusalem by Nebuchadnezzar II in 587 BC. There are solo roles for the prophet Jeremiah (baritone), King Zedekiah (tenor), and for the non-historical characters of Chamital, Zedekiah's mother (soprano), Achicam, a pious Jew (tenor), and Hanna, Achicam's sister (mezzo-soprano). Steinheim's libretto is largely based on Martin Luther's translation of the Bible into German.

== Reception ==
Robert Schumann was at the premiere, and wrote that the oratorio "especially delights us with its powerful colouring, firmness, and seriousness of style"; he felt that, despite the composer's many years in Italy, "it is a German work throughout." Comparing it to Mendelssohn's St. Paul, he felt Hiller's to be a more forward-looking work. Mendelssohn was also in the audience and joined in the warm reception given to the piece. Following the German premiere, Hiller sought to arrange performances of the oratorio abroad and wrote to Fromental Halévy asking for his help to arrange one in Paris; but Halévy's response was lukewarm, offering only the opportunity to perform extracts at the Paris Conservatoire.

The first American performance of the work was in 2008 when it was conducted by Leon Botstein.

== Other oratorios on the same subject ==
There are other German oratorios of the same or similar names: these include Die Zerstörung von Jerusalem by Carl Loewe, libretto by Gustav Nicolai (1829); Jerusalems Zerstörung durch Titus by Eduard Naumann, libretto by Eduard Schüller (1851); Der Fall Jerusalems by Martin Blumner (1875); and Die Zerstörung Jerusalems by August Klughardt, libretto by Leopold Gerlach (1899). These however all deal with the destruction of Jerusalem by Titus in AD 70. The 1852 oratorio Jerusalem by the Anglo-German composer Henry Hugh Pierson also deals with Titus's destruction of the city.

== Recording ==
Die Zerstörung Jerusalems, Querstand VKJK 1202, (2012). Camerata Lipsiensis, Patrick Grahl, Gregor Meyer, Choir of Leipzig Gewandhaus.
