= Solomon Steinheim =

German physician, poet, and philosopher

Solomon Ludwig (Levy) Steinheim (pseudonym: Abadjah Ben Amos; 1789–1866) was a German physician, poet, and philosopher.

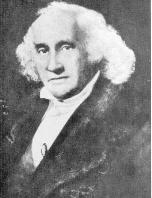
Solomon Steinheim

== Biography ==
Steinheim was born on 6 August 1789 in Altona (according to some authorities, in Bruchhausen, Westphalia). He was educated first at the Gymnasium Christianeum, Altona, and pursued his medical studies at the University of Kiel. He had hardly graduated when he found a wide field for his activity in Altona, to where the inhabitants of the sister city of Hamburg, then occupied by the French troops, had fled to escape the Russian blockade, bringing with them typhus fever, which at that time was raging in the Hanseatic town. In 1845 ill health forced him to abandon a medical career and to move to a milder climate. He settled in Rome, returning to his country only twice, in 1845 and 1864. He died on 19 May 1866 in Zurich, Switzerland.

The Salomon Ludwig Steinheim Institute of the University of Duisburg-Essen in Duisburg, Germany has been named after him in recognition of his contributions as a philosopher.

== Works ==
Steinheim, besides remaining a lifelong student of Aristotle, Hippocrates, and Celsus, took great interest in natural history. In 1820 he published a pamphlet on the grasshopper, and in 1842 one on animal instinct. His treatise on the pathology of tumors (1846) was his chief contribution to medical literature. His main attention, however, was devoted to philosophy and religion; he was a zealous adherent of Immanuel Kant. As early as 1818 he had written an essay on ecstasis; and in 1835 he published the first volume of his Die Offenbarung nach dem Lehrbegriff der Synagoge. In this work, for which he prepared himself by a careful study of comparative religion, he, though a freethinker, endeavored to raise revelation from a religious belief to a philosophic truth. While, according to him, all important philosophic systems lead to the dualistic struggle between good and evil, the revelation of the Old Testament places in the forefront as axioms "creatio ex nihilo," and, consequently, the unity of God, belief in which is essential to religion and morality.

The second volume of Steinheim's life-work consisting of twenty-five lectures, appeared under the title Das Dogma der Synagoge als Exakte Wissenschaft; the third volume (1863) treats of the struggle between revelation and paganism; while the fourth volume (1865) contains a series of separate essays on various subjects (e.g., the theory of Creation according to the Old Testament), polemics against Ignaz von Döllinger's Heidenthum und Judenthum and Ferdinand Christian Baur's Dogmengeschichte, etc.

Steinheim in his Meditationen and in his contributions to the Kieler Zeitung earnestly advocated the emancipation of the Jews. Of his poems, Sinai and Obadjah Sohn Amos Lieder aus der Verbannung (Altona, 1829; 2d ed. Frankfort-on-the-Main, 1837) deserve special mention.

He also wrote the libretto, based on Martin Luther's Bible translation, to Ferdinand Hiller's 1840 oratorio, The Destruction of Jerusalem.
