= Red Dot Design Award =

German international design prize

reddot design award
- Awarded for: Product and industrial design; Brand and communication design; Design concepts
- Sponsored by: Haus der Industrieform
- Venue: Aalto Theatre, Essen, Germany
- Website: red-dot.org

The Red Dot Design Award is an international, annual, pay-to-play design competition for product and industrial design, brand and communication design as well as design concepts, in which the Red Dot quality label is awarded to winners. The Red Dot Design Award, which is organized by Red Dot GmbH & Co. KG, dates back to 1954 when the "Verein Industrieform e. V." was founded.

The competition is divided into the three disciplines Red Dot Award: Product Design, Red Dot Award: Brands & Communication Design and Red Dot Award: Design Concept. Participation in the competition is subject to a fee, the submissions are then evaluated by an international jury. Products, concepts and works that have received the Red Dot Design Award are presented in exhibitions (e.g. the Red Dot Design Museum in Essen), yearbooks and online. In addition, winning designers and companies can use the "Red Dot" quality label for their product and corporate communication.

== History ==
The Red Dot Design Award goes back to the association Haus der Industrieform e.V. (House of Industrial Form e.V.), which was founded on July 30, 1954 in Essen. Starting in October 1955, Haus Industrieform began hosting a permanent exhibition at the Kleines Haus der Villa Hügel as well as hosting a design award. Around 600 "exemplary" industrial products from 120 companies were shown, which had been previously selected by a twelve-person jury. From November 1961, the exhibition was on display in the Old Synagogue in Essen. After a fire in the Old Synagogue, the exhibition moved to the Amerikahaus on Kennedyplatz in 1980. From the mid-1980s, the North Rhine-Westphalian State Ministry of Economic Affairs acted as a project sponsor and the design competition was called Design Innovations from 1985 forward. In 1990, as a result of restructuring, the organization was renamed to Design Zentrum Nordrhein Westfalen e.V. (Design Center North Rhine-Westphalia e.V.). In the same year, the Design Zentrum Nordrhein Westfalen moved to the old municipal library on Hindenburgstraße.

On April 1, 1991, Peter Zec became managing director of the Design Zentrum Nordrhein Westfalen, who brought to the concept of the award a more contemporary face. In order to give the competition a more concise appearance, Zec introduced the Red Dot (Roter Punkt) as a distinction for award-winning products. The idea of introducing the Red Dot as a design award goes back to the procedure in art galleries, where a red dot next to a work of art symbolizes the successful sale of the work. The symbol was designed by Otl Aicher in 1991 for the Design Zentrum Nordrhein Westfalen.

However, in order to promote the competition rather than the institution that hosted it, graphic designer Kurt Weidemann visually reconceived the Red Dot logo in 1994. This period marked the award's internationalization through the encouragement of entries from companies in North and South America, Asia, and Europe. The German Roter Punkt was translated more and more frequently into other languages, so that inconsistent designations for the competition developed worldwide. Therefore, the management decided to change the German expression Roter Punkt to Red Dot and to have a new logo and label designed. This led to commissioning graphic designer Peter Schmidt for a further remodeling of the Red Dot Award logo in 2000. Meanwhile, in 1997, the organization moved to its current location at Zollverein.

In the early years of the 21st century international recognition of the award had grown and by 2005 a second museum for displaying award-winning exhibits was established in Singapore. By 2015 the Red Dot exhibition in Essen had about 2,000 exhibits from 45 countries.

== Disciplines and categories ==
The Red Dot is awarded in the three categories "product design", "brands & communication design" and "design concept". The award winners receive a certificate and can use the "Red Dot" as a quality label for their product or corporate communication.

=== Red Dot Award: Product Design ===
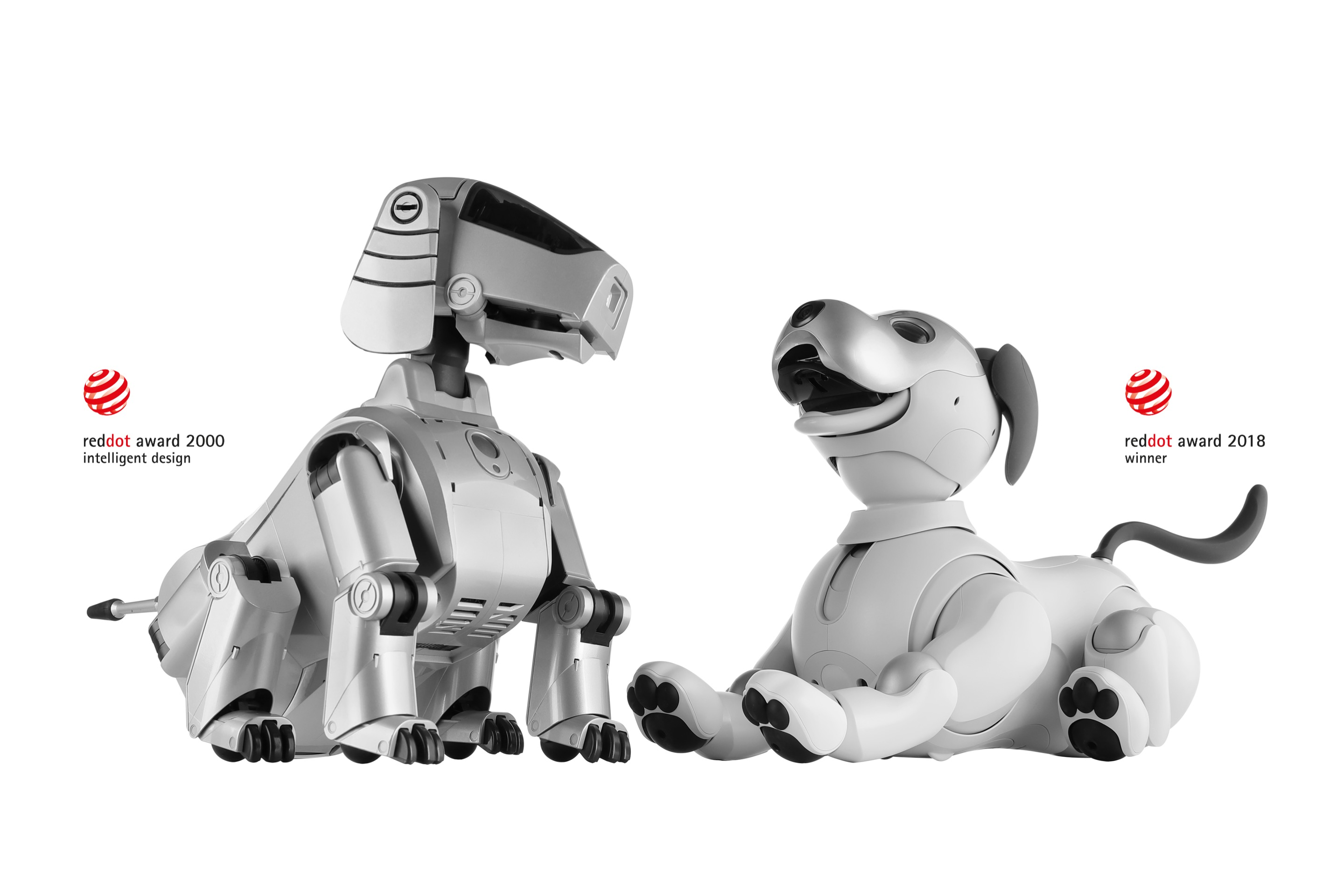
AIBO robotic dog

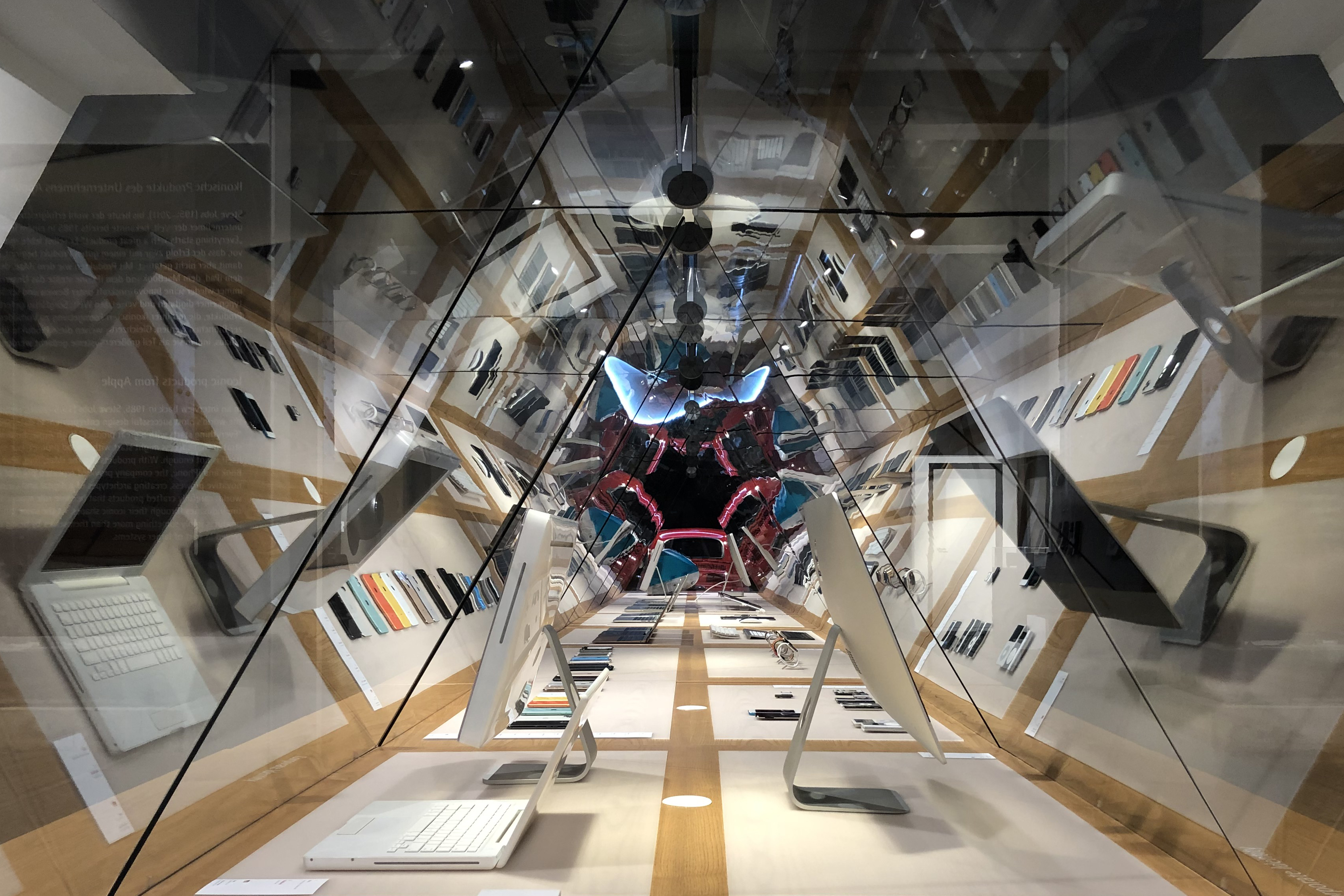
Award-winning Apple products at the Red Dot Design Museum in Essen

The oldest of the three awards, the Red Dot Award: Product Design, had been known as Design Innovations until 2000. It is given for products with a "good or excellent design quality". The awarding ceremony takes place annually at the Aalto Theatre in Essen. Overall, the Red Dot Award: Product Design is composed of around fifty categories from a wide variety of areas such as computers, medical devices, glasses, office furniture, household or bicycles. Some of the best-known award-winning products include Sony's robot dog AIBO, the iPod, iPhone and iMac from Apple, as well as the Ferrari LaFerrari and 296 GTB.

Previous winners were, for example, the Nikon Nikkor Z 58 mm f/0.95 S Noct (2020), the Anex m/type PRO stroller (2021), and the Waterson Self-Closing Swing Clear Hinge (2023).

==== Red Dot: Design Team of the Year ====
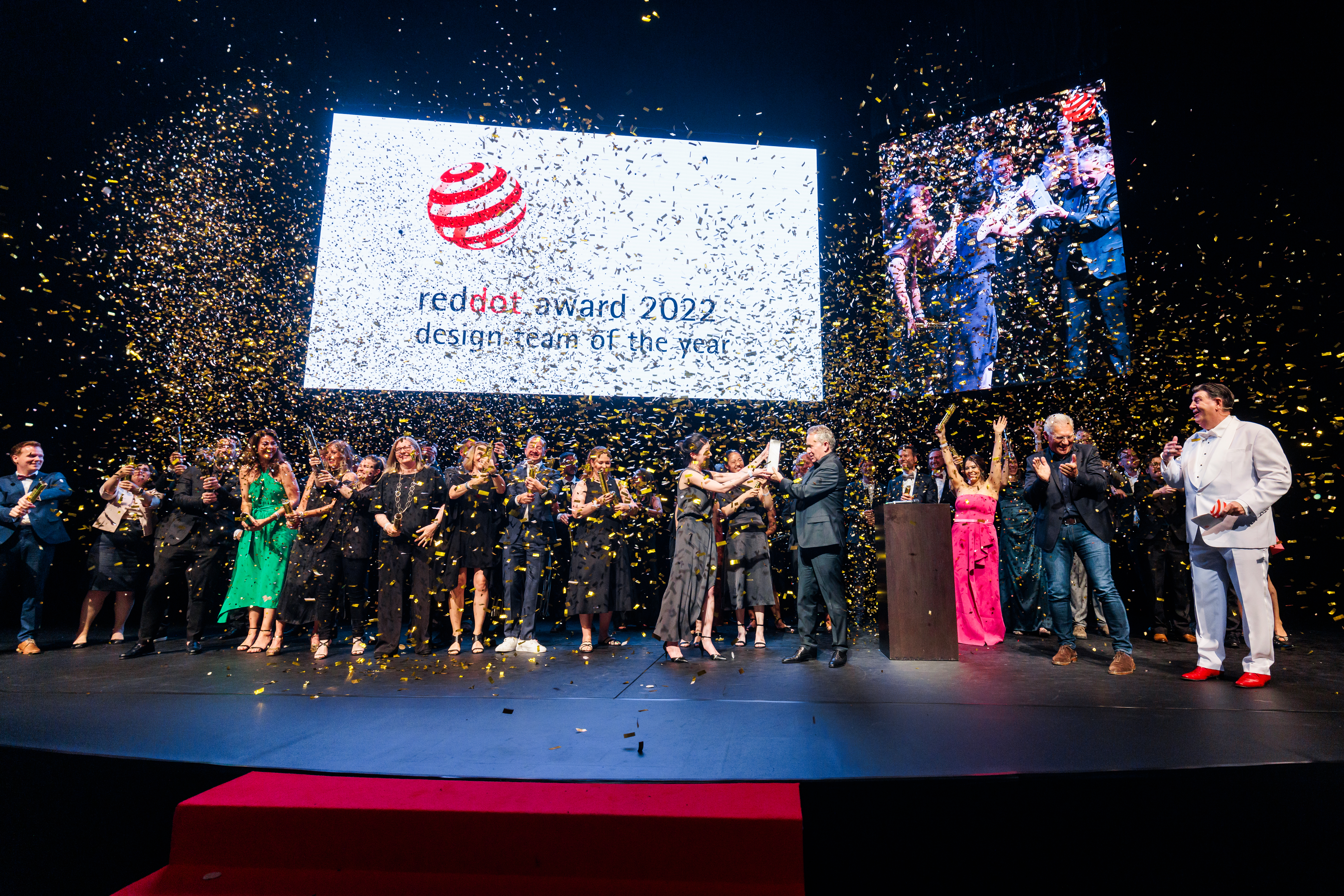
The Philips Experience Design Team was named Red Dot: Design Team of the Year 2022.

Every year since 1988, a design team that has distinguished itself through its continuously innovative design achievements has been honored with the Red Dot: Design Team of the Year award, as part of the Red Dot Award: Product Design. The Red Dot: Design Team of the Year is honored by handing over the "Radius", a sculpture as a challenge trophy on which all the names of the previous winners are engraved.

Previous winners were, for example, the Philips Experience Design Team (2022), Studio F. A. Porsche, (2021), Waterson In-house Design Team, (2023) and the Fiskars Design Team (2020).

=== Red Dot Award: Brands & Communication Design ===
Since 1993, the award has also been given for communication design. As part of the Red Dot Award: Brands & Communication Design, a design studio or communication agency has been honored with the Red Dot: Agency of the Year award every year since 2008. The Red Dot: Agency of the Year is honored by handing over the "stylus", a sculpture on which the names of all previous award winners are engraved. Previous winners were, for example, agencies such as MetaDesign (2022), Denkwerk (2021), Interbrand (2020), Think Create LLC (2018).

=== Red Dot Award: Design Concept ===
In 2005, Red Dot established the Red Dot Design Museum Singapore as well as an award for design concepts and prototypes. The Red Dot Award: Design Concept focuses on design concepts, ideas, and visions. The Red Dot Award: Design Concept is targeted towards young, up-and-coming creative talents, designers, and design companies around the world. Part of the Design Concept Award is the Red Dot: Luminary, which is the highest award within the Red Dot Award for design concepts. It has been awarded to designs such as the Trailer Drone by Hyundai Motor or glasses for the blind by Lumen.

=== Other awards ===
The Red Dot: Junior Prize, worth 10,000 euros, is awarded as part of the Red Dot Award: Brands & Communication Design. In addition, the Red Dot: Personality Prize has been awarded since 2020. As of March 2023, Jean-Claude Biver and Claudio Luti have been awarded the Personality Prize.

== Evaluation of submissions ==
Submissions to the Red Dot Design Award are evaluated by a jury consisting of designers, professors and specialist journalists from various disciplines. In 1955, the jury had 12 members. In 2022, the jury had 48 members from 23 nations. The jury evaluates the submissions – divided into categories – by themselves. Objects that are too large for the jury's premises (e.g. cars, motor cycles and trucks) can be held in a dedicated area at Essen/Mülheim Airport.

=== Evaluation criteria ===
In the case of products, the jury evaluates the quality of "good design" based on four evaluation criteria: the quality of function, aesthetics, usability and responsibility. A product must have a recognizable purpose and be easy and self-explanatory to use, while the product must be aesthetic and sustainable or long-lasting. Although the individual qualities may vary in strength, none of them should be entirely absent.

An article in the Stuttgarter Zeitung in 1992 used the example of the Aldo Rossi espresso pot to explain these assessment criteria, particularly in terms of quality of function and aesthetics: The pot is placed directly on the cooker to heat the contents. Due to the design of the spout and lid, the hot contents are inevitably splashed onto the cooker top when preparing hot drinks due to the high steam pressure inside. In addition, the metal handle piece is directly connected to the bottom of the pot, so that there is a considerable risk of injury from burns or scalding when using the espresso pot. Rossi's espresso pot is therefore aesthetically pleasing, but not very useful.

== Publication of winners ==
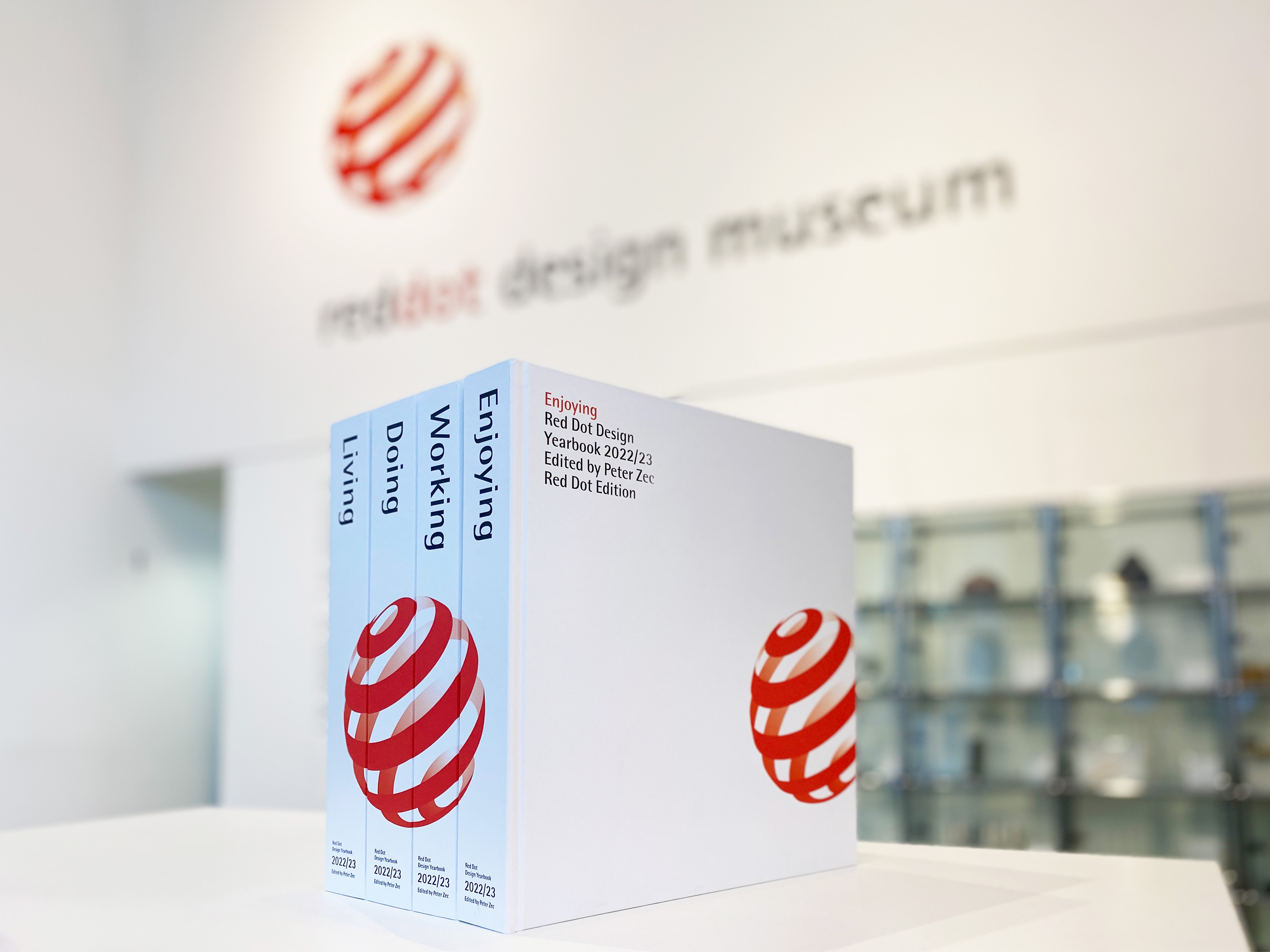
Red Dot Design Yearbook 2022/23

The award-winning projects are presented in various formats. All products are presented in annual yearbooks since 1985, which are published by Red Dot Edition since 2001. Designers whose products receive the "Red Dot: Best of the Best" award are presented in exclusive interviews. Award-winning brands and works in graphic and communication design are published in the annual International Yearbook Brands & Communication Design. Concepts and studies are presented in the Red Dot Design Concept Yearbook, which is being published since 2005. Together with the yearbooks, a chronicle of international product and design culture has been developed of the end of the 20th century and the beginning of the 21st century. Further, all winners of the three categories can be viewed online, ranging back to the year 2011. The design concepts awarded by the jury and the award-winning works in brand and communication design can also be accessed. Selected winners from each category are exhibited in three museums, which are located in Essen, Singapore and Xiamen. The Red Dot Design Museum in Essen is one of the most important design museums with the world's largest exhibition of contemporary design. In Essen, on an area of around 4000 m^{2}, more than 2000 exhibits of contemporary design, which have been awarded the Red Dot Design Award, can be seen in annually changing exhibitions.

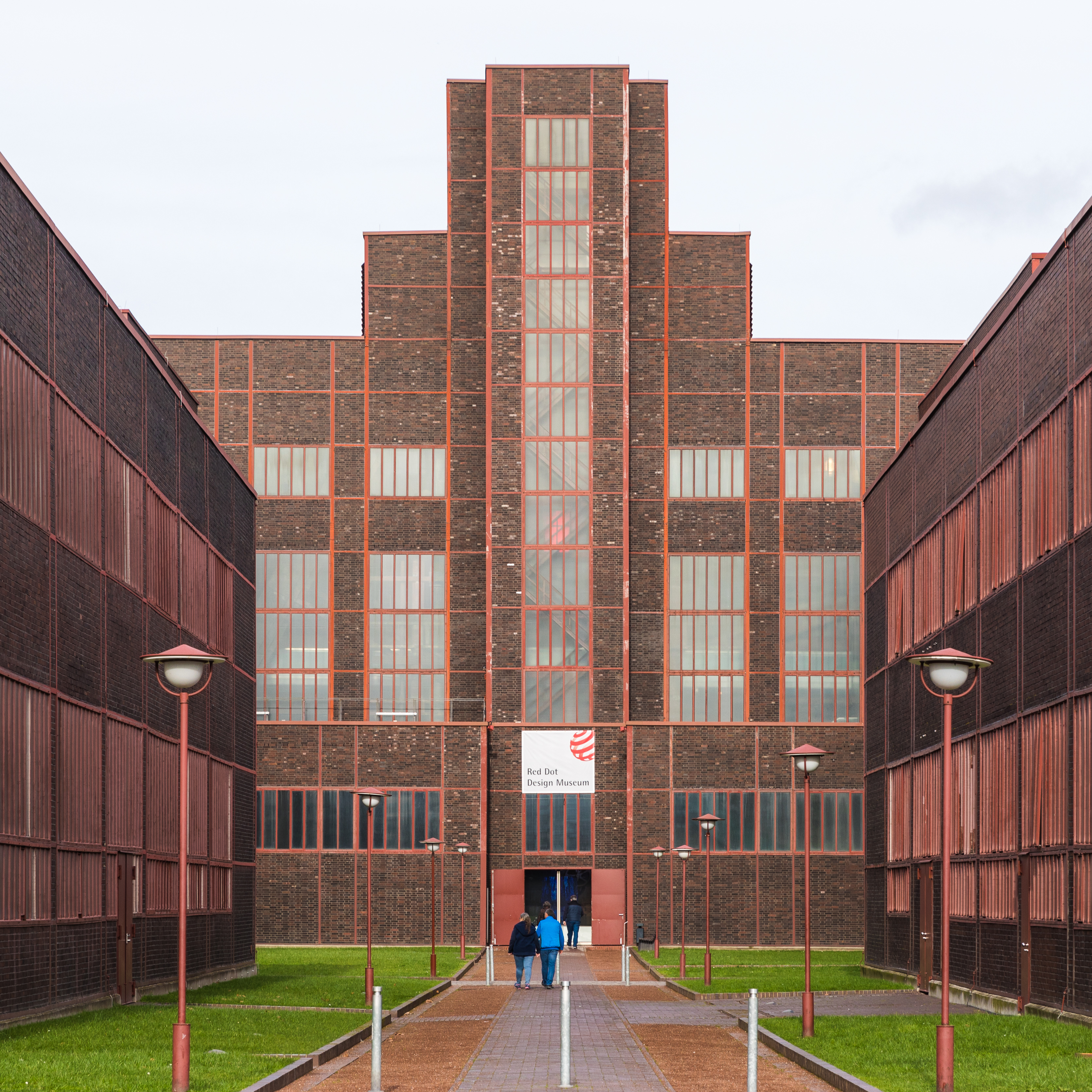
The Red Dot Design Museum in the boiler house of Zollverein coal mine, shaft 12

== Financing ==
In the 1950s, the Haus der Industrieform e.V. association received part of its financial resources from Krupp. The family and the Krupp Group financed both the furnishing of the Industrieform building and the renovation of the Old Synagogue. Since the move to the boiler house in the Zollverein, part of the income has come from renting out space for product presentations, company conferences and events.

Further, a fee is charged for registering works. In order to enable smaller design offices and companies to take part in the Red Dot Design Award, 50 free places in the competition are raffled among young designers every year.

Each of the approximately 3,500 winning designs each year are required to pay a fee which can range between 1,950 and 7,500 euros, depending on the category and prize.

== Reception ==
In 2006, the Frankfurter Allgemeine Zeitung stated that the Red Dot Design Award was one of only three relevant design prizes in Germany. In academia, voices stated that the Red Dot Design Award is one of the most important design prizes since the mid-2010s. Deutsche Welle stated in 2017 that the Red Dot Design Award was "one of the most important design prizes in the world".

Designer Michael Brandis emphasized in 2017 that being awarded the Red Dot Design Award promotes a designer's career and that the prize promotes "the importance of design in general" due to its desirability. Brandis nevertheless criticized the number of awards and the number of categories in which awards are given. Alan Posener also deemed the red dot irrelevant for consumers since about every fifth product submitted receives an award.

== See also ==
- List of design awards

== Bibliography ==
- Aynsley, J.; Clarke, A.J.; Messell, T. (2022). International Design Organizations: Histories, Legacies, Values. Bloomsbury Publishing. ISBN 978-1-350-11253-7.
- Pietsch, R.; Grubbe, G. (2013). DuMont Bildband Entdecke Deutschland: 100 Touren zu Natur, Kultur und Geschichte (in German). Dumont Reiseverlag. ISBN 978-3-7701-8935-9.
- Reinhardt, Frank A.; Wanninger, Claudia (2004). Die rote Linie: auf der Suche nach Spitzenleistungen im Design. Eine Fallstudie am Beispiel des Design-Zentrums Nordrhein-Westfalen; 1954 – 2004 (in German). Ludwigsburg: AV Edition. ISBN 978-3-89986-047-4.
- Woodham, Jonathan (2016). "Red Dot Design Award". A Dictionary of Modern Design (2nd ed.). Oxford University Press. ISBN 978-0-19-251853-8.
- Zec, Peter (2015). Dauernde, nicht endgültige Form (Festschrift 60 Jahre Designgeschichte – von der Industrieform zum Red Dot) [Permanent, not final form (Festschrift 60 years of design history – from the industrial form to the Red Dot)] (in German). Essen: Red Dot Edition. ISBN 978-3-89939-182-4.
