= Julius H. Schoeps =

German historian

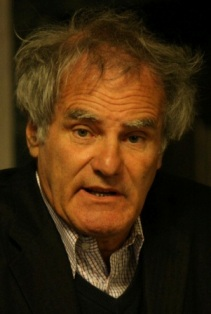
Image of Julius H. Schoeps

Julius Hans Schoeps (born 1 June 1942 in Djursholm, Sweden) is a German historian.

He is the founding director of the Moses-Mendelssohn Center for European Jewish Studies at the University of Potsdam and chairman of the board of the Moses-Mendelssohn Foundation. Schoeps is the first director and co-founder of the Salomon Ludwig Steinheim Institute in Duisburg.

== Biography ==
Julius H. Schoeps, whose ancestors include the philosopher Moses Mendelssohn (1729-1786) and the religious reformer and textile entrepreneur David Friedländer (1750-1834), was born during the exile from Nazi Germany of his parents, the religious philosopher and historian Hans-Joachim Schoeps (1909-1980) and Dorothee Busch (1915-1996), in Djursholm, Sweden. His younger brother Manfred was born there on 1 January 1944. In 1948, Schoeps followed his father, who had already returned to Germany from exile in 1946.

== Education and work ==
In 1963, Schoeps passed his Abitur and began studying history, political science, communications and theater at Erlangen and the Free University of Berlin. In 1969, he obtained his doctorate, and in 1973 his habilitation. From 1974 to 1991, he was professor of political science at the University of Duisburg, and from 1986 to 1991, he was also founding director of the Salomon-Ludwig-Steinheim Institute for German Jewish History in Duisburg. Between 1980 and 2007, Schoeps held visiting professorships in Budapest, Tel Aviv, New York, Oxford and Seattle.

Since the late 1960s, Schoeps has worked as a journalist for daily and weekly newspapers (including Die Zeit, Die Welt, FAZ, NZZ, PNN), magazines and numerous radio and TV stations.

From 1991 to 1994, Schoeps was a member of the founding senate of the University of Potsdam, and from 1991 to the 2007 summer semester, he was professor of modern history (focusing on German Jewish history) at the University of Potsdam. From 1992 to 2014, he was founding director of the Moses-Mendelssohn Center for European Jewish Studies, an institute affiliated to the University of Potsdam. From 2001 to 2007, Schoeps was also spokesman for the DFG doctoral school "Makom - Ort und Orte im Judentum" at the University of Potsdam.

From 1984 to 2014, Schoeps was President of the Society for Intellectual History (GGG), founded by his father Hans-Joachim Schoeps in Erlangen in 1958, and Editor-in-Chief of the Zeitschrift für Religions- und Geistesgeschichte (ZRGG). From 1993 to 1997, Schoeps was founding director of the Vienna Jewish Museum, from 1995 to 2005 founding director of the Moses-Mendelssohn Academy in Halberstadt, and since 2018 he has been chairman of the board.

Since 2002, Schoeps has been President of the Moses-Mendelssohn Foundation, which continues the tradition of the Moses Mendelssohn Foundation for the Advancement of the Humanities founded in 1929. The foundation - founded by Mendelssohn descendants and members of the Mendelssohn-Bartholdy family - promotes education, training, science and research in the field of European Jewish history and culture. The foundation is a shareholder in the GBI group of companies, and in this context is involved in charitable building projects, including the construction and management of student residences in various cities in Germany and Austria.

== Claims for restitution for artworks from the Nazi era ==
Since 2003, as spokesperson for the heirs of banker Paul von Mendelssohn-Bartholdy, Schoeps has been fighting for the return of various works of art that belonged to him. In early 2009, an agreement was reached with the Guggenheim Museum and the Museum of Modern Art in New York concerning two paintings by Picasso, Le Moulin de la Galette and Boy with a Horse. In January 2010, the heirs reached an agreement with the owner of the Picasso painting Portrait d'Angel Fernández de Soto, Andrew Lloyd Webber. The painting remained in the possession of Webber, who subsequently sold it to Christie's auction house in June 2010.

== Scholarly work and associations ==
From 2008 to 2014, Julius H. Schoeps is spokesperson for the Walther Rathenau Graduate School "Liberalismus und Demokratie: Zur Genealogie und Rezeption politischer Bewegungen von der Aufklärung bis zur Gegenwart" of the Friedrich Naumann Foundation, and since 2014, for the Ludwig Rosenberg Research College "Historische Bezüge zwischen Arbeiterbewegung und Judentum" of the Hans Böckler Foundation. Schoeps' academic students include Anna Carolin Augustin, Sven Brömsel, Hannah Lotte Lund, Barbara Steiner, Olaf Glöckner, Anna-Dorothea Ludewig, Alexandra Nocke, Dekel Peretz, Ines Sonder, Susanne Urban-Fahr, Elke-Vera Kotowski et Armin Pfahl-Traughber. Schoeps is a member of the PEN Centre Germany.

The scholarly work of Julius H. Schoeps deals with questions of religious and intellectual history, the history of political ideas and the history of German-Jewish relations. As a publisher and co-publisher, Schoeps edits writings and letters by German-speaking authors of the 19th and 20th centuries (including by Felix Busch, Hermann Cohen, Gabriel Riesser, Theodor Herzl, Léon Pinsker, Aaron Bernstein, Franz Oppenheimer, Karl Emil Franzos, Fritz Heymann, Hans-Joachim Schoeps). Many of Schoeps' books and essays are available in different languages.

== Honors ==
- 1997 : Goldener Rathausmann of Vienna
- 2005 : Order of Merit of the Federal Republic of Germany, 1st class
- 2009 : Austrian Decoration for Science and Art, 1st class
- 2014 : Order of Merit of Brandenburg
- 2020 : Order of Merit of the Federal Republic of Germany, Great Cross of Merit

== Selected works ==
=== As author of co-author ===
- Von Olmütz nach Dresden 1850/51. Ein Beitrag zur Geschichte der Reformen am Deutschen Bund (= Veröffentlichungen aus den Archiven Preußischer Kulturbesitz. Band 7). Grote, Köln / Berlin [West] 1972, ISBN 3-7745-0234-X.
- Bismarck und sein Attentäter. Der Revolveranschlag Unter den Linden am 7. Mai 1866. Ullstein, Berlin [West] 1984, ISBN 3-550-07963-X.
- Über Juden und Deutsche. Historisch-politische Betrachtungen. Burg-Verlag, Stuttgart/ Bonn 1986. (2., überarbeitete und erweiterte Neuauflage (= Deutsche-jüdische Geschichte durch drei Jahrhunderte. Band 4). Olms, Hildesheim 2010)
- Leiden an Deutschland. Vom antisemitischen Wahn und der Last der Erinnerung. Piper, München 1990, ISBN 3-492-11220-X.
- Bürgerliche Aufklärung und liberales Freiheitsdenken. A. Bernstein in seiner Zeit (= Studien zur Geistesgeschichte. Band 14). Burg-Verlag, Stuttgart/ Bonn 1992, ISBN 3-922801-51-X.
- Theodor Herzl und die Dreyfus Affäre (= Wiener Vorlesungen. Band 34). Picus, Wien 1995.
- Theodor Herzl 1860–1904. Wenn Ihr wollt, ist es kein Märchen. Eine Bild-Text-Monographie. Wien 1995.
- Deutsch-jüdische Symbiose oder die mißglückte Emanzipation. Bodenheim/Mainz 1996. Lizenzausgabe für die Wissenschaftliche Buchgesellschaft, Darmstadt 1996; Neuauflage unter dem Titel Die missglückte Emanzipation. Wege und Irrwege deutsch-jüdischer Geschichte. Philo, Berlin u. a. 2002, 2. Auflage, ISBN 3-8257-0220-0.
- Das Gewaltsyndrom. Verformungen und Brüche im deutsch-jüdischen Verhältnis. Argon, Berlin 1998, ISBN 3-87024-463-1.
- Preußen. Geschichte eines Mythos. Bebra, Berlin 2000, ISBN 3-89809-003-5. TB-Ausgabe 2004, Philo Verlag, ISBN 3-8257-0362-2
- Mein Weg als deutscher Jude. Autobiographische Notizen. Pendo, Zürich 2003, ISBN 3-85842-544-3.
- „Du Doppelgänger, du bleicher Geselle …“. Deutsch-jüdische Erfahrungen im Spiegel dreier Jahrhunderte 1700–2000. Philo, Berlin/ Wien 2004, ISBN 3-8257-0361-4.
- Palästinaliebe. Leon Pinsker, der Antisemitismus und die Anfänge der nationaljüdischen Bewegung in Deutschland. Philo, Berlin/ Wien 2005, ISBN 3-86572-530-9.
- als Mitautor: Building a Diaspora. Russian Jews in Israel, Germany and the USA (= International Comparative Social Studies. Band 13). Brill, Leiden 2006, ISBN 90-04-15332-2.
- Das Erbe der Mendelssohns. Biographie einer Familie. S. Fischer, Frankfurt am Main 2009, ISBN 978-3-10-073606-2.
- David Friedländer. Freund und Schüler Moses Mendelssohns. Olms, Hildesheim 2012; 2. Auflage ebenda 2017, ISBN 978-3-487-08592-0.
- Pioneers of Zionism: Hess, Pinsker, Rülf. Messianism, Settlement Policy, and the Israeli-Palestinian Conflict. De Gruyter, Berlin/ Boston 2013, ISBN 978-3-11-031458-8.
- Der König von Midian. Paul Friedmann und sein Traum von einem Judenstaat auf der arabischen Halbinsel. Koehler & Amelang, Leipzig 2014, ISBN 978-3-7338-0398-8.
- Begegnungen. Menschen, die meinen Lebensweg kreuzten. Suhrkamp, Berlin 2016, ISBN 978-3-633-54278-9.
- Hat der Siedlungsgedanke in der zionistischen Ideologie noch eine Zukunft. AphorismA, Berlin 2017, ISBN 978-3-86575-579-7.
- Düstere Vorahnungen. Deutschlands Juden am Vorabend der Katastrophe (1933–1935). Hentrich & Hentrich, Leipzig 2018, ISBN 978-3-95565-273-9, TB-Ausgabe 2021 ISBN 978-3-95565-439-9.
- Dorothea Veit/Schlegel. Ein Leben zwischen Judentum und Christentum. Hentrich & Hentrich, Berlin 2020 (= Jüdische Miniaturen. Band 250), ISBN 978-3-95565-388-0.
- Gabriel Riesser. Demokrat-Freiheitskämpfer-Vordenker. Hentrich & Hentrich, Leipzig 2020 (= Jüdische Miniaturen. Band 256), ISBN 978-3-95565-412-2.
- Im Kampf um die Freiheit. Preußens Juden im Vormärz und in der Revolution von 1848. Hamburg 2022, ISBN 978-3-86393-136-0

=== As editor ===
- mit Joachim H. Knoll: Friedrich Albert Lange. Leben und Werk. Braun Verlag, Duisburg 1975.
- mit Immanuel Geiss: Revolution und Demokratie in Geschichte und Literatur. Festschrift für Walter Grab. Braun Verlag, Duisburg 1979.
- mit Walter Grab: Juden im Vormärz und in der Revolution 1848. Burg Verlag, Stuttgart/Bonn 1983.
- mit Joachim H. Knoll: Von kommenden Zeiten. Geschichtsprophetien im 19. und 20. Jahrhundert. Burg Verlag, Stuttgart/Bonn 1984.
- mit Alphons Silbermann: Antisemitismus nach dem Holocaust. Bestandsaufnahme und Erscheinungsformen in deutschsprachigen Ländern. Köln 1986.
- mit Walter Grab: Juden in der Weimarer Republik. Burg Verlag, Stuttgart/ Bonn 1986.
- mit Heinz Kremers: Das jüdisch-christliche Religionsgespräch (= Studien zur Geistesgeschichte. Band 9). Burg Verlag, Stuttgart/ Bonn 1988.
- Juden als Träger bürgerlicher Kultur in Deutschland (= Studien zur Geistesgeschichte. Band 11). Burg Verlag, Stuttgart/ Bonn 1989, ISBN 3-922801-48-X.
- Neues Lexikon des Judentums. Gütersloher Verlagshaus, Gütersloh 1992, ISBN 3-579-02305-5.
- mit Arno Herzig: Reuchlin und die Juden (= Pforzheimer Reuchlinschriften, Bd. 3), Sigmaringen 1993, ISBN 3-7995-6029-7
- mit Eberhard Jäckel und Peter Longerich: Enzyklopädie des Holocaust, 3 Bände. Argon, Berlin 1993. (Taschenbuch-Ausgabe: Piper, München 1995 und 1998).
- mit Joachim Schlör: Antisemitismus. Vorurteile und Mythen. Piper, München 1995, ISBN 3-492-03796-8.
- mit Stépane Moses und Joachim Schlör: Manès Sperber als Europäer. Eine Ethik des Widerstandes. Edition Hentrich, Berlin 1996.
- mit Willi Jasper und Bernhard Vogt: Russische Juden in Deutschland. Integration und Selbstbehauptung in einem fremden Land. Beltz, Weinheim 1996.
- mit Stépane Moses und Joachim Schlör: Manès Sperber als Europäer. Eine Ethik des Widerstandes. Edition Hentrich, Berlin 1996, ISBN 3-89468-165-9.
- mit Peter Krüger und Irene Diekmann: Der verkannte Monarch. Friedrich Wilhelm IV in seiner Zeit (= Brandenburgisch Historische Studien. Band 1), Potsdam 1997, ISBN 3-930850-67-2.
- mit Michael Ley: Der Nationalsozialismus als politische Religion. Philo Verlag, Bodenheim bei Mainz 1997, ISBN 3-8257-0032-1.
- Wirtschaft und Gesellschaft. Franz Oppenheimer und die Grundlegung der Sozialen Marktwirtschaft. Philo Verlag, Bodenheim bei Mainz 1999, ISBN 3-8257-0128-X.
- Enteignet durch die Bundesrepublik Deutschland. Der Fall Mendelssohn-Bartholdy. Eine Dokumentation. Philo Verlag, Bodenheim bei Mainz 1997, ISBN 3-8257-0045-3.
- mit Irene Diekmann und Peter Krüger: Geopolitik. Grenzgänge im Zeitgeist. Teil 1: 1890 bis 1945. Teil 2: 1945 bis zur Gegenwart. Verlag für Berlin Brandenburg, Potsdam 2000, ISBN 3-932981-68-5.
- mit Tobias G. Natter: Max Liebermann und die französischen Impressionisten. Dumont, Bonn 1997, ISBN 3-7701-4294-2.
- Leben im Land der Täter. Juden im Nachkriegsdeutschland (1845–1952). Berlin 2001, ISBN 3-934658-17-2.
- mit Andreas Nachama und Hermann Simon: Juden in Berlin. 3 Bände. Henschel, Berlin/ Leipzig 2001–2009, ISBN 3-89487-336-1.
  - Band 1: Die Juden in Berlin. 2001, ISBN 3-89487-336-1.
  - Band 2: Biographien. Hrsg. von Elke-Vera Kotowski. 2005, ISBN 3-89487-461-9.
  - Band 3: Bilder, Dokumente, Selbstzeugnisse. Hrsg. von Irene A. Diekmann. 2009, ISBN 978-3-89487-611-1.
- mit Gert Mattenklott und Michael Philipp: „Verkannte brüder“? Stefan George und das deutsch-jüdische Bürgertum zwischen Jahrhundertwende und Emigration. Olms, Hildesheim 2001.
- mit Irene Diekmann: Das Wilkomirski-Syndrom. Eingebildete Erinnerungen oder Von der Sehnsucht Opfer zu sein. Pendo Verlag, Zürich/ München 2002, ISBN 3-85842-472-2
- mit Elke-Vera Kotowski und Hiltrud Wallenborn: Handbuch zur Geschichte der Juden in Europa. Wissenschaftliche Buchgesellschaft, Darmstadt 2001, ISBN 3-534-14086-9.
- mit Eliezer Ben-Rafael und anderen: Building a Diaspora. Russian Jews in Israel, Germany and the USA (= International Comparative Social Studies, Bd. 13), ISBN 978-90-04-15332-5.
- mit Anna-Dorothea Ludewig: Eine Debatte ohne Ende? Raubkunst und Restitution im deutschsprachigen Raum. Verlag für Berlin-Brandenburg, Berlin 2007.
- mit Elke-Vera Kotowski, Vom Hekdesch zum Hightech. 250 Jahre Jüdisches Krankenhaus im Spegel der Geschuiche der Juden in Berlin, Berlin 2007.
- Bibliothek Verbrannter Bücher. Eine Auswahl der von den Nationalsozialisten verbotenen und verfemten Bücher. 10 Bände. Olms, Hildesheim 2008.
- mit Lars Rensmann: Politics and Resentment. Antisemitism and Counter-Cosmopolitanism in the European Union. Brill, Leiden 2011, ISBN 978-90-04-19046-7.
- mit Olaf Glöckner: A Road to Nowhere. Jewish Experiences un Unifying Europe (= Jewish Identities in a Changing World, Vol. 17), ISBN 978-90-04-20158-3
- mit Anna-Dorothea Ludewig und Ines Sonder: Aufbruch in die Moderne. Sammler, Mäzene und Kunsthändler in Berlin 1880–1933. Köln 2012, ISBN 978-3-8321-9428-4.
- mit Olaf Glöckner: Deutschland, die Juden und der Staat Israel. Eine politische Bestandsaufnahme. Olms, Hildesheim 2016, ISBN 978-3-487-08580-7.
- mit Elizer Ben-Rafael, Olaf Glöckner und Yitzhak Sternberg: Handbook of Israel. Major Debates. 2 Bände. De Gruyter, Berlin 2016, ISBN 978-3-11-035160-6.
- mit Elke-Vera Kotowski und anderen: Zakhor. Imaginations of the former Jewish Vilne in modern Lithuanian Art. Hentrich & Hentrich, Berlin 2016, ISBN 978-3-95565-143-5.
- mit Thomas L. Gertzen: Grenzgänger. Jüdische Wissenschaftler, Träumer und Abenteurer zwischen Orient und Okzident. Hentrich & Hentrich, Berlin und Leipzig 2020, ISBN 978-3-95565-375-0.
- mit Martina Bitunjac: Complicated Complicity. European Collaboration with Nazi-Germany during World War II. De Gruyter, Berlin/Boston 2021.

=== Annotated texts and editions of letters and other ===
- Zionismus. Vierunddreissig Aufsätze. Nymphenburger Verlagshandlung, München 1973, ISBN 3-485-03216-6.
- Friedrich Albert Lange. Die Arbeiterfrage. Jedermann Hauseigenthümer. Sozialpolitik zwischen Liberalismus und Sozialismus (= Duisburger Hochschulbeiträge. Band 4). Braun Verlag, Duisburg 1975.
- Im Streit um Kafka und das Judentum. Max Brod/Hans-Joachim Schoeps. Briefwechsel. Königstein/Ts. 1985.
- Richard Meyer von Achenbach. Gedanken über eine konstruktive deutsche Ostpolitik. Denkschrift aus dem Jahre 1953. Athenäum Verlag, Frankfurt am Main 1986.
- Auf der Suche nach einer jüdischen Theologie. Der Briefwechsel zwischen Schalom Ben-Chorin und Hans-Joachim Schoeps. Frankfurt am Main 1989, ISBN 3-610-00424-X.
- mit Alex Bein u. a.: Theodor Herzl. Briefe und Tagebücher. 7 Bände. Propyläen, Berlin/ Frankfurt/ Wien 1983–1996.
- mit Alphons Silbermann und Hans Süssmuth: Franz Oppenheimer: Gesammelte Schriften. 3 Bände, Berlin 1995–1998.
  - Band 1: Theoretische Grundlegung
  - Band 2: Politische Schriften
  - Band 3: Schriften zur Marktwirtschaft
- Fritz Heymann. Tod oder Taufe. Die Vertreibung der Juden aus Spanien und Portugal im Zeitalter der Inquisition. Jüdischer Verlag, Frankfurt am Main 1988, ISBN 3-610-00409-6.
- Felix Busch. Aus dem Leben eines königlich-preußischen Landrats, Berlin 1991, 2. Auflage, Potsdam 2000
- A. Bernstein. Ghettogeschichten. Vögele der Maggid/ Mendel Gibbor. Hentrich, Berlin 1994.
- mit Hanna Delf: Gustav Landauer-Fritz Mauthner, Briefwechsel 1890–1919. C.H. Beck, München 1994, ISBN 3-406-38657-1.
- mit Jutta Dick: Salomon Ludwig Steinheim und Johanna Steinheim. Briefe (= Haskala. Wissenschaftliche Abhandlungen, Bd. 9) Olms, Hildesheim 1996.
- Gabriel Riesser: Gesammelte Schriften (= Bibliothek des deutschen Judentums), 4 Bde. Olms, Hildesheim 2001.
- A. Bernstein in seiner Zeit. Briefe und Materialien (= Haskala. Wissenschaftliche Abhandlungen. Band 43). Olms, Hildesheim 2010.

Écrits recueillis

- Deutsch-jüdische Geschichte durch drei Jahrhunderte. Ausgewählte Schriften. 10 Bände und ein Ergänzungsband (Die späten Jahre und Bibliographie). Olms, Hildesheim 2010–2013.

== Bibliography ==
- Ludger Heid, Joachim H. Knoll (Hrsg.): Deutsch-jüdische Geschichte im 19. und 20. Jahrhundert. Festschrift zum 50. Geburtstag. Burg-Verlag, Stuttgart/ Bonn 1992, ISBN 3-922801-44-7.
- Willi Jasper, Joachim H. Knoll (Hrsg.): „Preußens Himmel breitet seine Sterne …“. Beiträge zur Kultur-, Politik und Geistesgeschichte der Neuzeit. Festschrift zum 60. Geburtstag. 2 Bände (= Haskala. Wissenschaftliche Abhandlungen. Band 26/1– 2). Olms, Hildesheim 2002.
- Irene Diekmann, Elke-Vera Kotowski (Hrsg.): Geliebter Feind, gehasster Freund. Antisemitismus und Philosemitismus in Geschichte und Gegenwart. Festschrift zum 65. Geburtstag. Verlag für Berlin-Brandenburg, Berlin 2008, ISBN 978-3-86650-334-2.
