= Old Synagogue (Essen) =

Former synagogue in Essen, Germany

- German: Alte Synagoge
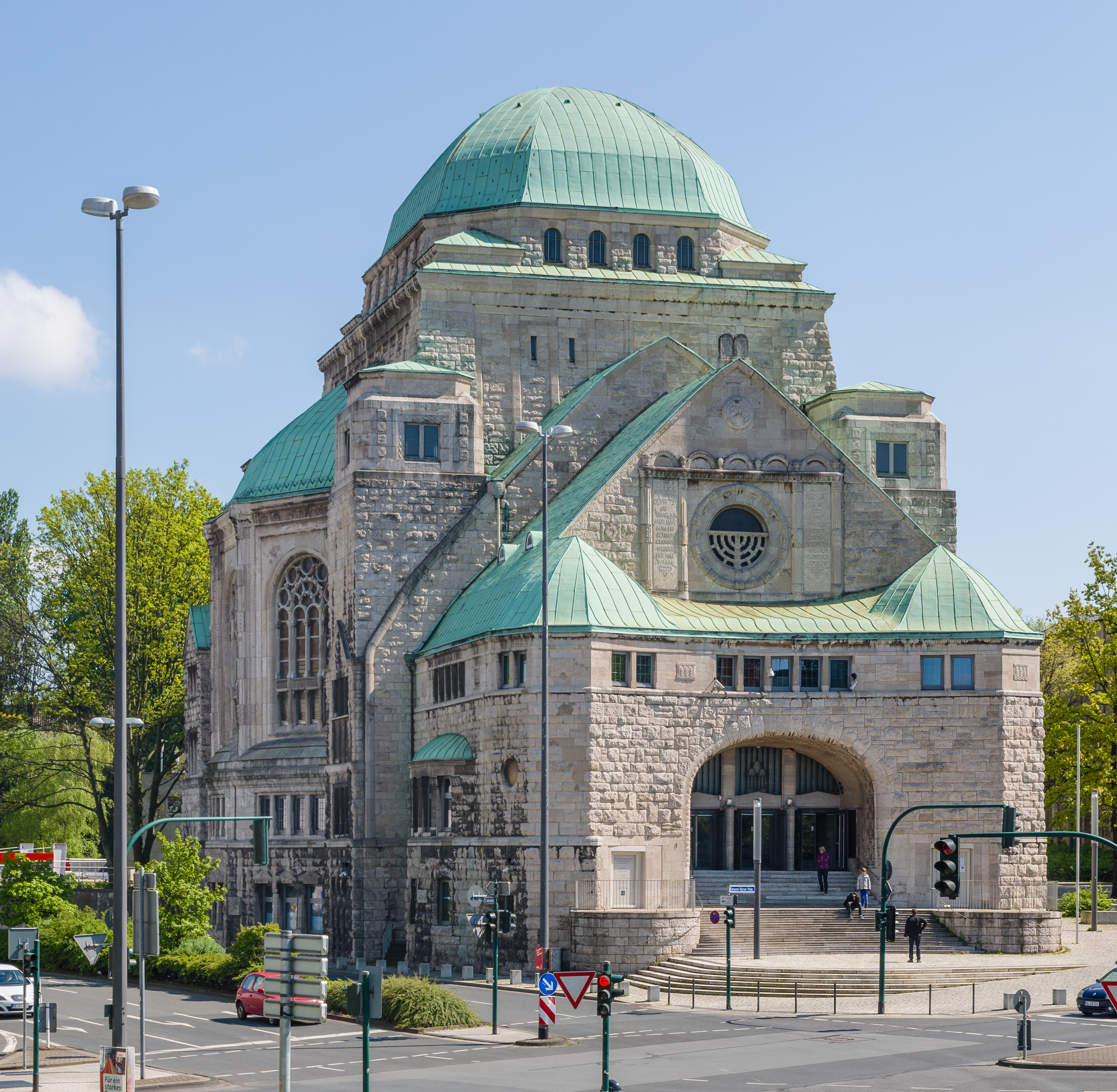
- The former synagogue, as seen from Edmund-Körner-Platz in 2014

- Location of the former synagogue in North Rhine-Westphalia

Religion
- Affiliation: Reform Judaism (former)
- Ecclesiastical or organizational status: Synagogue (1913–1938); Jewish museum (since 1960)
- Status: Closed (as a synagogue); Repurposed (as a museum)

Location
- Location: Steeler Straße 29, Essen, North Rhine-Westphalia
- Country: Germany
- Interactive map of Old Synagogue
- Coordinates: 51°27′23″N 7°01′00″E

Architecture
- Architect: Edmund Körner
- Type: Synagogue architecture
- Style: Byzantine Revival; Art Nouveau; Jugendstil (former interior)
- Established: 1858 (as a congregation)
- Groundbreaking: 1911
- Completed: 1913

Specifications
- Height (max): 37 m (121 ft)
- Dome: One
- Materials: Stone; copper

Website
- alte-synagoge.essen.de (in German)

The Old Synagogue (German: Alte Synagoge) is a former Reform Jewish congregation and synagogue, located at Steeler Straße 29, in Essen, in the state of North Rhine-Westphalia, Germany. The former synagogue was repurposed in 1960 as a Jewish museum.

The building is one of the largest, best preserved and architecturally most impressive testimonies to Jewish culture in pre-war Germany. Built in the centre of the city, the Byzantine Revival and Art Nouveau style former synagogue was originally consecrated as the Neue Synagoge in 1913 and operated as a synagogue until Kristallnacht in 1938. The building houses an institution dedicated to documenting and promoting the history of the city's former Jewish community.

After being severely damaged during Kristallnacht, but avoiding further damage from bombing during WWII, the burnt out interior was first completely redesigned to become a Museum of Industrial design in 1960. With greater interest in historic preservation, it underwent a second restoration in the 1980s to its original design; in preparation for its new use as a memorial centre and museum. The attached Rabbinerhaus (House of the Rabbi) has housed the Salomon Ludwig Steinheim Institute since 2011.

== History of the building ==
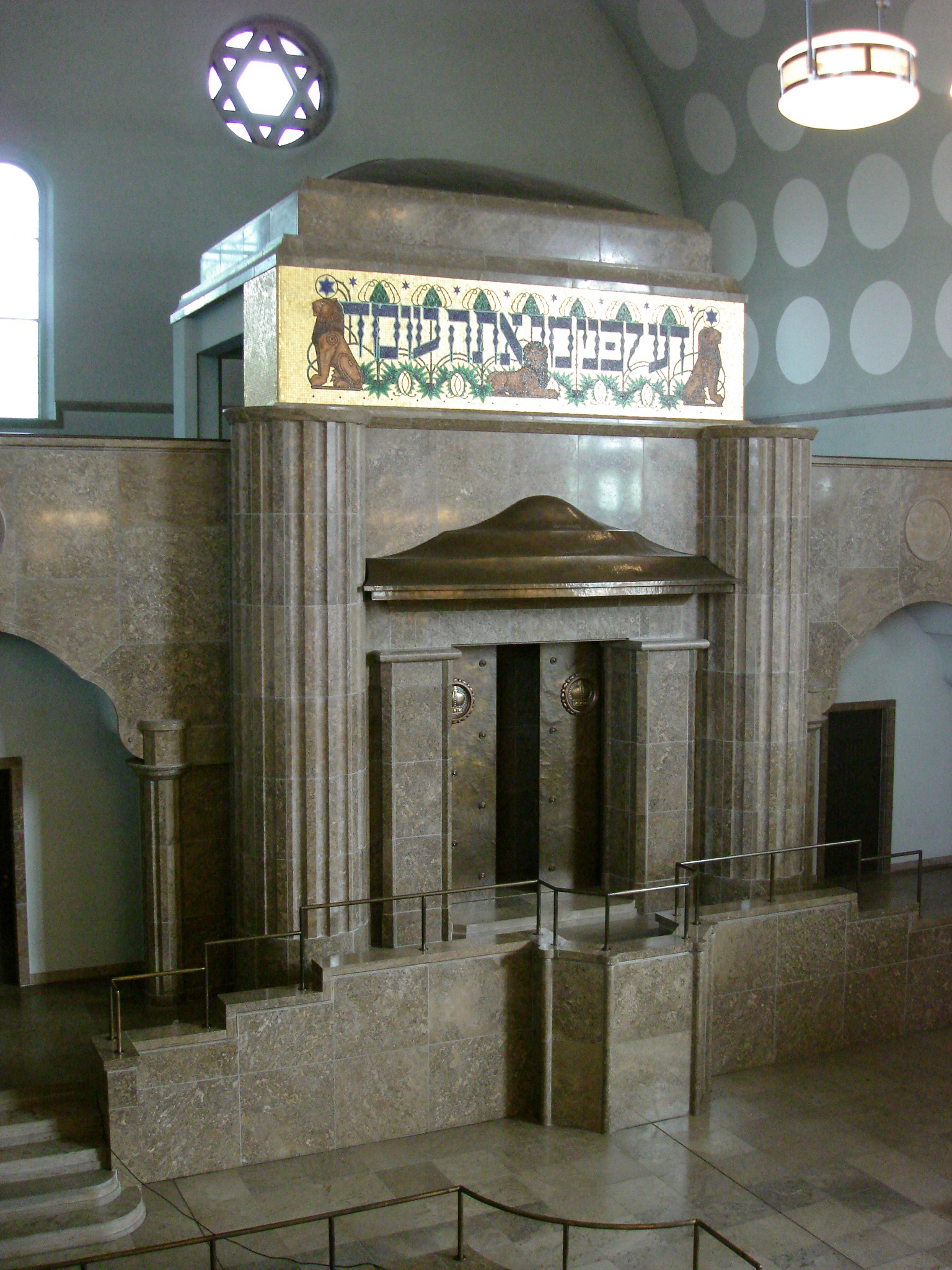
Torah ark of the Old Synagogue

With a rising number of Jewish families moving to Essen in the early 19th century, a community was formally established in 1858. The reform-oriented Rabbi Salomon Samuel was appointed in 1894, and with the growth of the Jewish community, he decided to build a new large synagogue in the middle of the city center that would mark the importance of Judaism in German society. The architect Edmund Körner was appointed, and designed a large Byzantine style stone building topped by a copper dome. Influenced by Jugendstil, the synagogue's interior was tiled deep blue with gold highlights. Salomon Samuel provided guidance on the interior's decoration so that it would reflect Jewish traditions; he gave special attention to the symbols contained in the mosaics and stained glass. One of the largest synagogues in Germany, it measured 230 feet (70m) from front to back and 98 feet in width with a dome that reached a height of 112 feet (37m). The building was inaugurated as the New Synagogue on 25 September 1913, and for 25 years it was the cultural and social center of a community that in 1933 had around 4,500 members. The main hall (which was also often used for concerts) could hold more than 1,500 people including those in several galleries. In front was an organ and a large bima (the area where the rabbi conducts the service). In addition to the large sanctuary, the building housed a secondary sanctuary for weekday services that had more modest attendance, classrooms, a community hall, a secretariat, and a library. Along with a garden, an attached 'Rabbinerhaus' at the rear of the structure had apartments for the rabbi and cantor.

The seizure of power by the National Socialists in 1933 began the Nazi era with increasingly more severe anti-Jewish policies culminating in Kristallnacht on 9–10 November 1938, a night when Jewish owned businesses and synagogues were attacked, many of which were burned to the ground. The Old Synagogue was set on fire, which destroyed the interior. The exterior remained nearly intact. Although Essen itself was very heavily bombed (see Bombing of Essen in World War II), the building itself managed to survive the Second World War without further damage.

From 1945 to 1959 the former synagogue stood unused as ruin at the edge of the Essen city center; members of the Jewish community who had survived The Holocaust used the Rabbinerhaus as their center. In 1959, the community built a much smaller synagogue, which is the current place of worship. In the same year, the city of Essen acquired the former synagogue and in the following years of 1960–1961 renovated it into a museum for industrial design, the "Haus Industrieform". For this purpose the interior was renovated, redesigned to fit its new purpose, the remnants of the synagogue's Torah ark were removed, and any surviving mosaics and ornaments were plastered or painted over. The main prayer hall was divided, a new floor was installed, and the ceiling was covered.

A fire, caused by a short circuit, severely damaged the Design exhibition in 1979. This event and a changed attitude toward handling historic buildings caused the city council of Essen to found the current institution Alte Synagoge, a place of remembrance and a center for historical and political documentation. From 1986 to 1988 the entire building was reconstructed, funded by the state of North Rhine-Westphalia, recapturing something of the former appearance, restoring the soaring dome (in plain plaster rather than the original blue mosaic), reinstating the balcony, and reconstructing the marble ark for the Torah.

== Today ==
In 1988 in the state of North Rhine-Westphalia, the City Council of Essen decided to create a house of Jewish culture and a memorial in the Old Synagogue. New exhibition areas were created. Steeler Strasse on the south side of the building was redirected and the city created a paved plaza named after the synagogue's architect, Edmund-Körner-Platz. The official reopening took place on 13 July 2010. Today the Alte Synagoge houses exhibitions and events for those interested in Jewish culture and religion, in addition to concerts, plays, readings and other cultural events.

Since 1988, the Salomon Ludwig Steinheim Institute, has researched the cultural, religious, and literary history of the Jews in the German-speaking world. In May 2011 it moved into the Rabbinerhaus in Essen, and cooperates in research and teaching with the University of Düsseldorf.

== Gallery ==
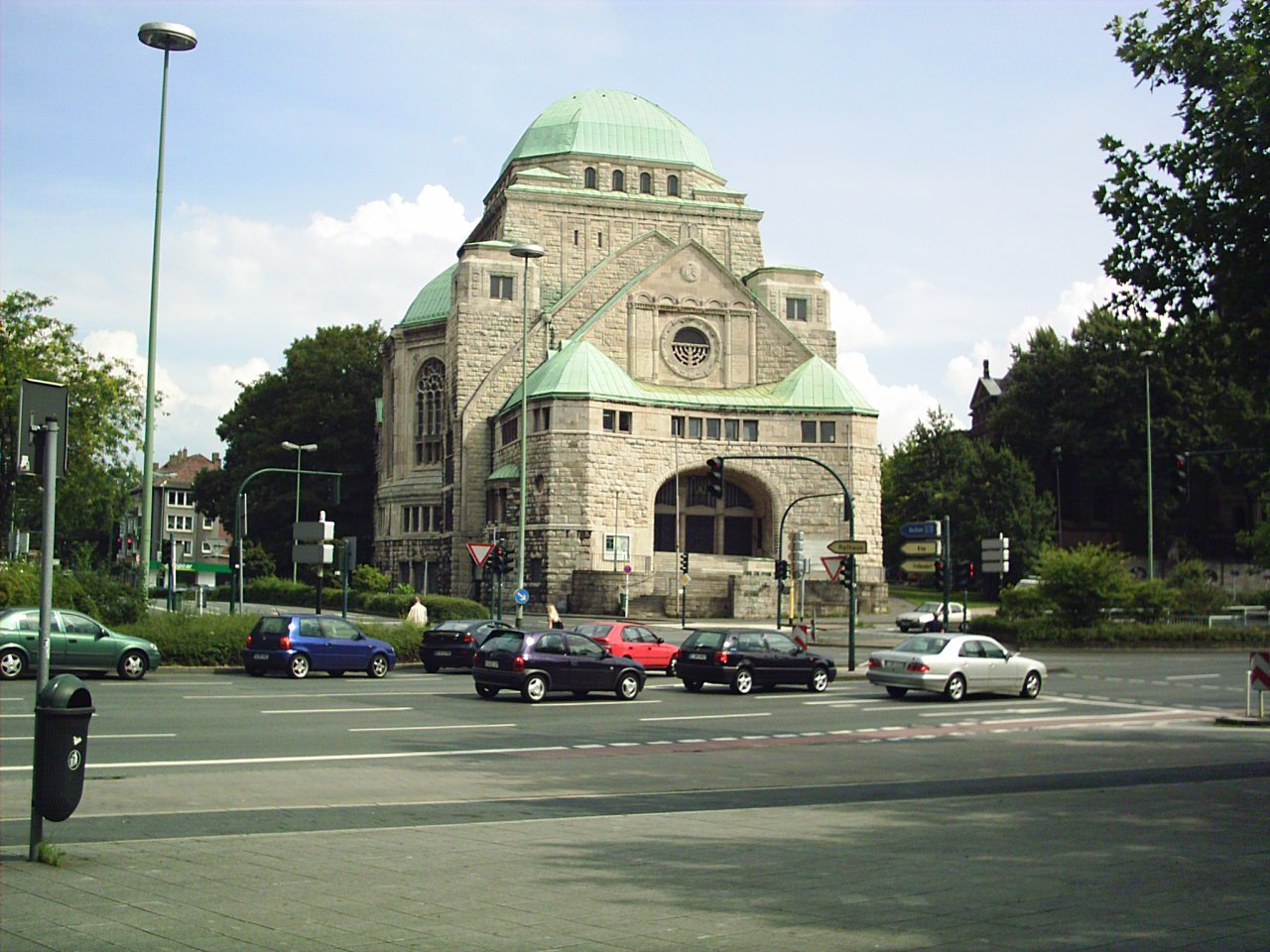
The Old Synagogue from outside

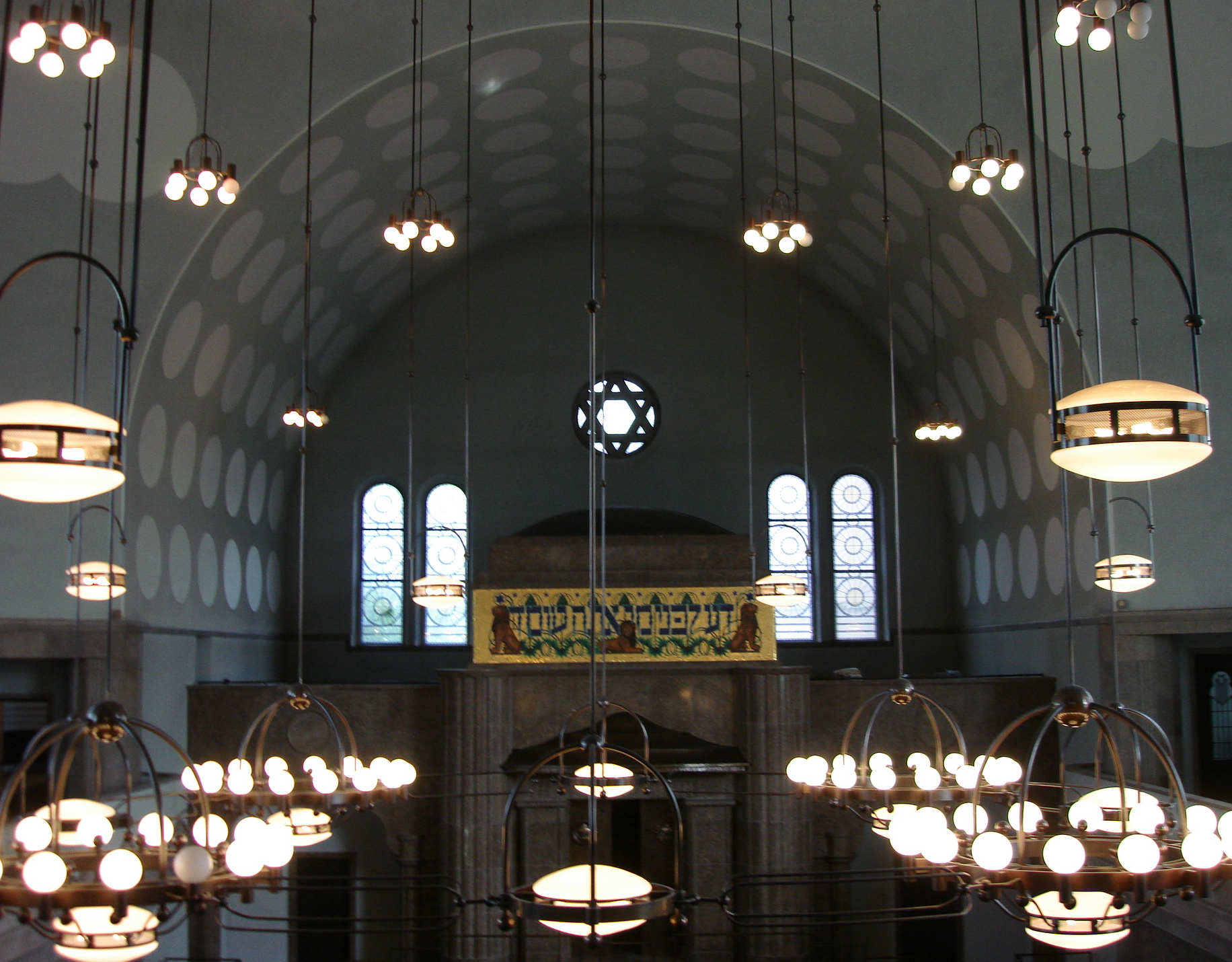
The Old Synagogue from inside

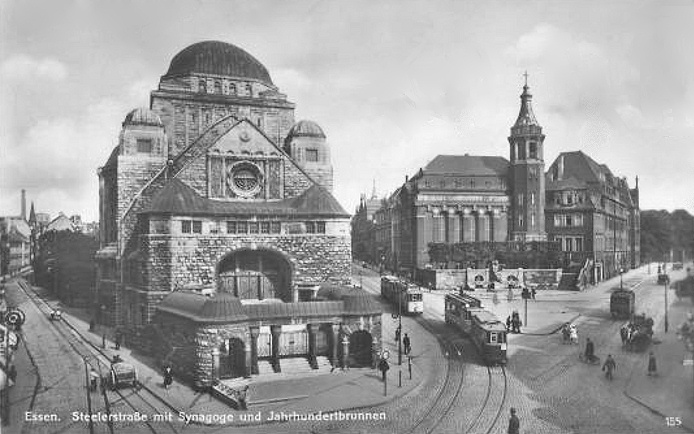
The Old Synagogue in 1922, on the right is the Friedenskirche (Church of Peace)

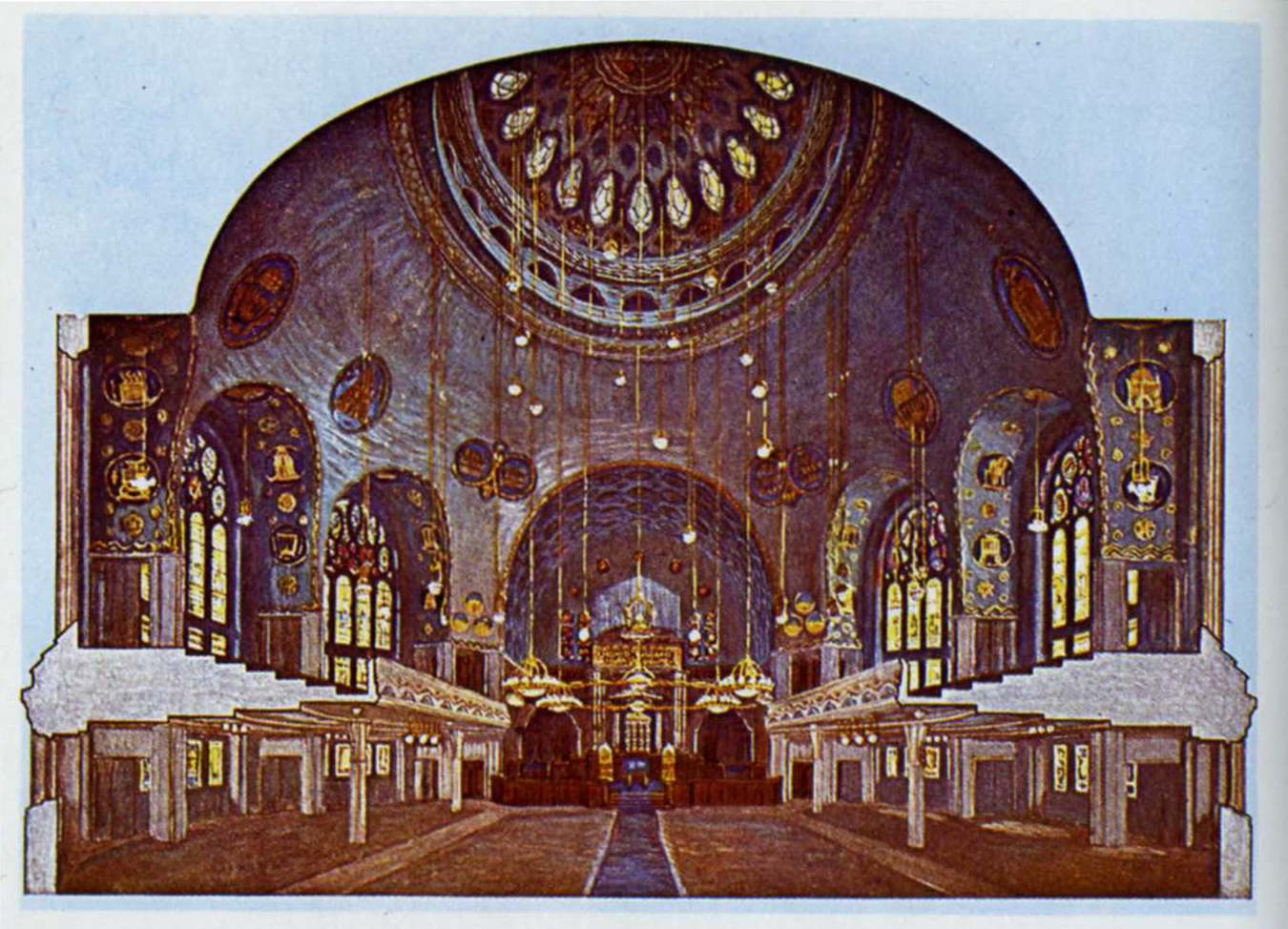
Interior of the Old Synagogue in 1913

== See also ==
- History of the Jews in Germany
- List of synagogues in Germany (in German)
