= Halfdan Kjerulf =

Norwegian composer (1815–1868)

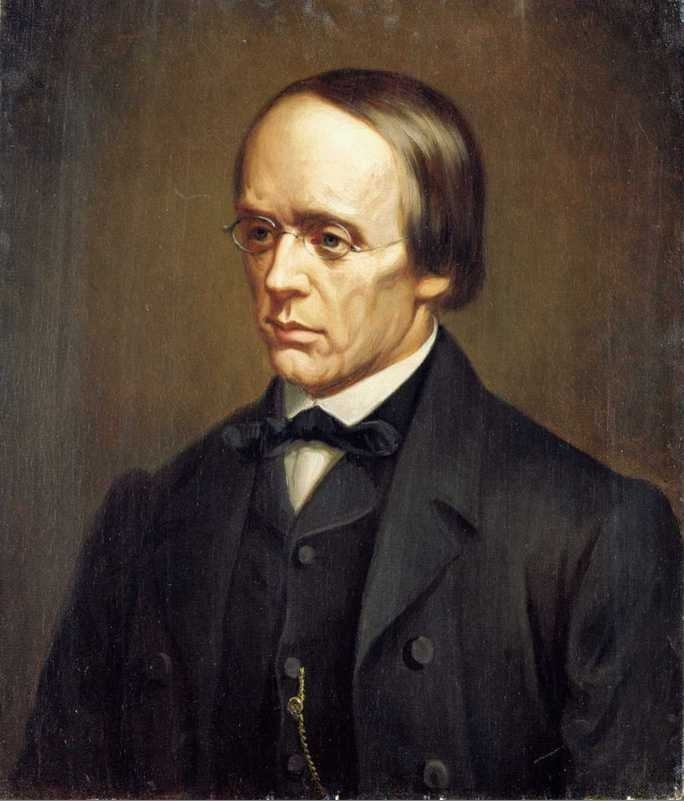
Halfdan Kjerulf

Halfdan Kjerulf (17 September 1815 – 11 August 1868) was a Norwegian composer.

== Biography ==
Kjerulf was born in Christiania (now Oslo), Norway. He was the son of a high government official. His early education was at Christiania University, for a legal career, but his studies ended in 1839 as a result of illness, and the next year he spent some time in Paris. Soon after his return his father and two siblings died and he took a job as a journalist at one of Oslo's main newspapers, Den Constitutionelle where Andreas Munch (1811–1884) was editor and where Kjerulf worked until 1845.

Kjerulf started his career as a music teacher and composer of songs before ever having seriously studied music at all, and not for ten years did he attract any particular notice. He was counted among those in the Modern Breakthrough movement in literature, painting and music which was replacing romanticism within Scandinavia. It was typified by the poet Johan Sebastian Welhaven, whose poems he set.

In 1848 he studied with German musician and composer Carl Arnold (1794-1873), and after studying with Niels Gade (1817–1890) in Copenhagen, the Norwegian Government paid for a year's instruction for him at Leipzig in 1850, where he was taught by Ernst Richter (1808–1879). For many years after his return to Norway, Kjerulf tried in vain to establish regular classical concerts, while he himself was working with Bjørnson and other writers at the composition of lyrical songs. He did present some concerts, at which he introduced the Norwegian public to Beethoven's Fifth Symphony and other standards otherwise little known to them. He obtained some official recognition during the 1860s. He died in Grefsen, near Christiania, in 1868, aged only 52.

== Legacy ==
His fame rests mainly on his national partsongs, solos and piano music. Edvard Grieg was an admirer of it and influenced him in writing his Lyric Pieces. It was recorded in its entirety in 2001 by Einar Steen-Nøkleberg. His piano students included Agathe Backer-Grøndahl and Erika Nissen (then known as Erika Lie).
