= Désiré Magnus =

Belgian pianist, teacher and composer (1828–1883)

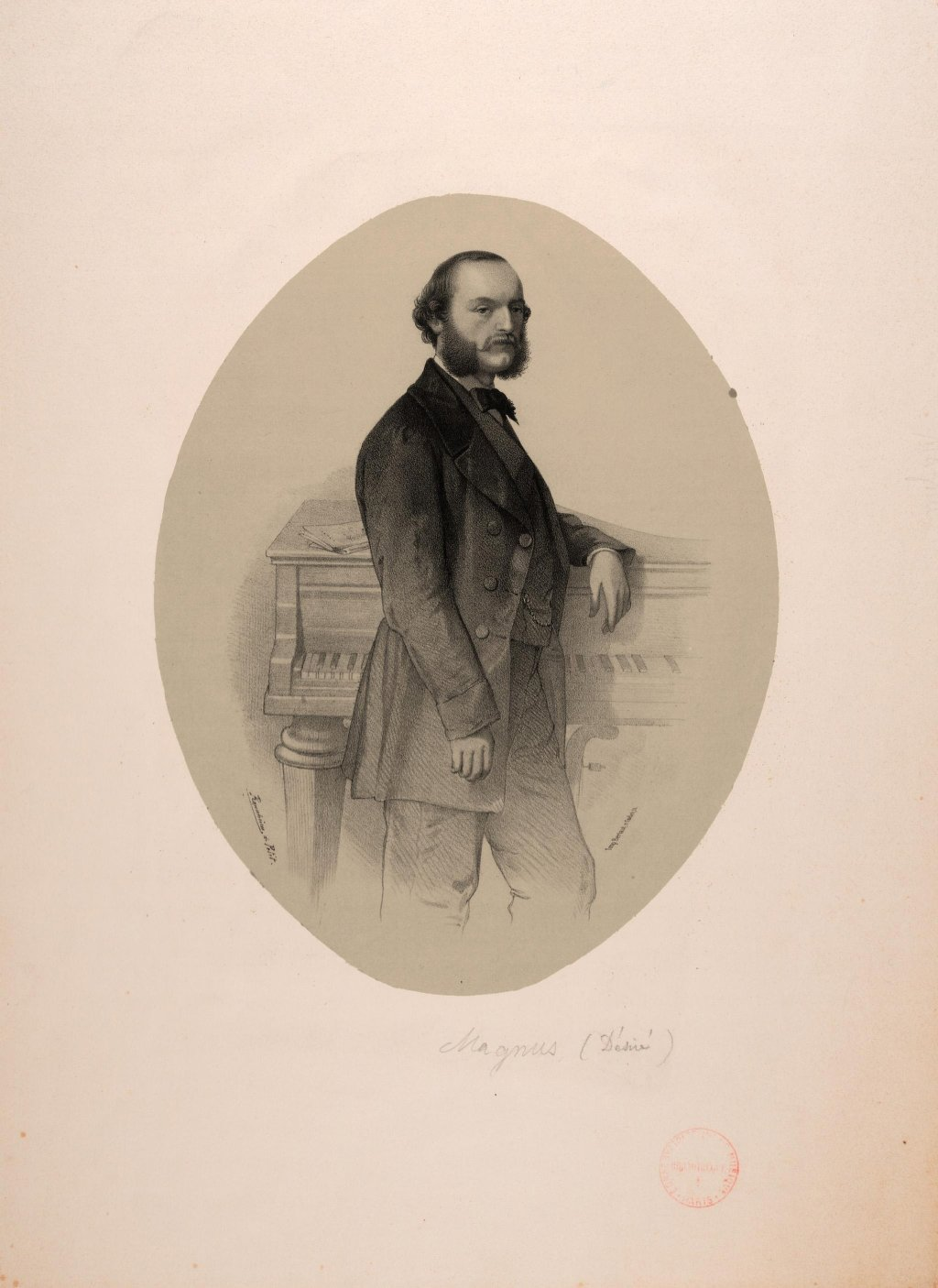
Désiré Magnus. Lithograph by Hermann Raunheim

Désiré Magnus (né Magnus Deutz; 13 June 1828 – 17 December 1883) was a Belgian concert pianist, teacher and composer of salon music who published under the pseudonym D. Magnus.

== Biography ==
Magnus was born in Brussels and studied piano with Georg Jacob Vollweiler (1770–1847) in Heidelberg and also at the Brussels Conservatory, receiving the First Prize in 1843. After several successful concert tours in England, Germany, Russia, Spain and other countries, he settled in Paris, and quickly gained a reputation as pianist, teacher, composer, and music critic.

Magnus' performance on the Steinway concert-grand piano at the Exhibition Universelle of 1867 inspired a lithograph by Amédée de Noé.

He died in Paris.

== Selected works ==
Opera

- La Tolédane (Paris: Salle Taitbout, 1874)

Chamber music

- Les Pleurs de la jeune fille, Nocturne for violin and piano, Op. 13b (1852); original for piano solo
- 5ème Nocturne for cello and piano (1877); original version for piano solo
- Duo sur des motifs de l'opéra "Paul et Virginie" de Victor Massé for violin and piano (1877); composed in collaboration with Henri Vieuxtemps

Vocal

- O povero garzon! (G. Duprez), Barcarolle vénetienne, Op. 139 (1874)
- Sur l'océan (Alphonse Labitte) (1878)
- C'est le printemps (A. Labitte) (1880)
- Chanson à boire (Paul Ginisty) (1880)
- Judas, Chant biblique (G. Boyer) (1881)
- Quand reviendra la violette (R. J. Pain) (1881)
- Regrets d'amour, Valse chantée (Paul Armand Silvestre) (1884)

Pedagogical

- 24 Études mélodiques et de vélocité dans tous les tons majeurs et mineurs préparation aux difficultés de doigté et de mécanisme que renferment les œuvres des maîtres du piano, anciens et modernes, Op. 190 (1876)
- Méthode élémentaire de piano (1879)

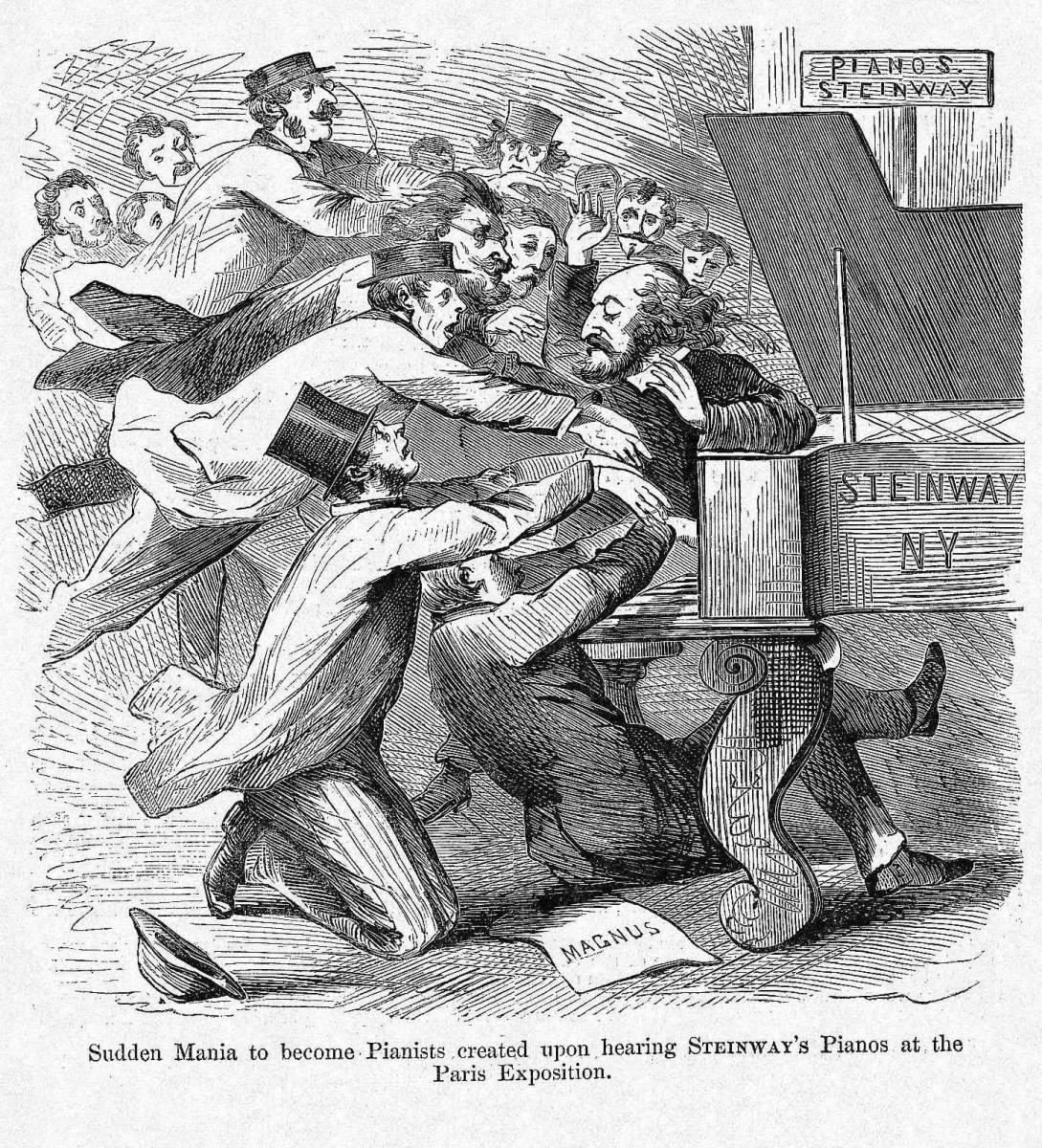
"Sudden Mania to become Pianists created upon hearing Steinway's Pianos at the Paris Exposition." This lithograph by Amédée de Noé conveys the wild popularity of the Steinway piano, the musicality of which had just been demonstrated by famed pianist Désiré Magnus, at the 1867 Exposition Universelle in Paris. (Harper's Weekly, 10 August 1867, reporting on the world exposition).

Piano solo

- Bords de l'adour, Polka No. 4, Op. 4
- Un Pensée, Romance-étude, Op. 5
- La Danse du lac bleu, Caprice, Op. 6
- Quadrille über norwegische Melodien in C major, Op. 10
- La Danse des ésprits, Caprice, Op. 12 (1851)
- 3 Études de concert (1852)
- Les Pleurs de la jeune fille, Rêverie, Op. 13 (1852); also for violin and piano
- Fantaisie brillante sur l'opéra "La nuit de Noël", Op. 16 (1853); paraphrase on La nuit de Noël by Napoléon Henri Reber
- 2 Romances sans paroles, Op. 17
- Saltarelle, Op. 18
- The Gipsy Schottische, Op. 22 (1853)
- The Royal Schottische, Op. 22 (1853)
- Lucie, Schottische, Op. 26 (1853)
- Réminiscences de L'éclair (1859); paraphrase on L'éclair by Fromental Halévy
- La Perle de l'Alhambre (La Perle de l'Exposition), Polka de concert, Op. 30 (1860)
- Souviens-toi, Rêverie, Op. 38
- Les Premiers Litas, Grande valse, Op. 42 (1855)
- 3 Pastorales, Op. 43
- Constantinople, Marche, Op. 44
- Tarantelle, Op. 45
- Bolero de salon, Op. 46
- Steeple-Chase, Grand galop de bravoure, Op. 51 (1859)
- Charmes du souvenir, Valse de salon, Op. 52
- Chanson polonaise, Op. 53 (1857)
- Maître corbeau, Variations, Op. 54
- Capriccio alla mazurka, Op. 56 (1859)
- Reminiscences de l'Éclair, Op. 57
- Souvenir du Piémont, Valse brillante, Op. 58 (1860)
- Herculanum de F. David, Grande fantaisie, Op. 59 (1860)
- Trois pastorales (1860)
- Figaro polka, Op. 61 (1860)
- Au gré des flots, Caprice-étude, Op. 62 (1860)
- Die Post, Op. 63
- Marche funèbre, Op. 64 (1860)
- Carnaval napolitain, Op. 65 (1860)
- Un Vœu à la Vièrge, Morceau de genre, Op. 66 (1860)
- Le Rêve d'une mère, Berceuse (1860)
- La Zingara, Polka mazurka (1860)
- Mazurka composée pour le Comte Koucheloff-Besborodko, arrangée pour Piano, Op. 69 (1861)
- 1er Nocturne, Op. 70 (1861)
- Souvenir du cocher, Andante religioso, Op. 71
- Chanson du temps passé, Idylle, Op. 73 (1861)
- L'Adieu du pêcheur, Esquisse musicale, Op. 74 (1861)
- Marche des mandarins, Caprice chinois, Op. 76 (1861)
- 2ème Nocturne, Op. 77 (1861)
- Harmonie des flots, Caprice-mazurka, Op. 77 (1861)
- La Tarabouka, Caprice moresque, Op. 80 (1862)
- Au printemps, Poésie fugitive, Op. 84
- Fleurs et dentelles, Caprice, Op. 85 (1864)
- Sérénade moscovite, Impromptu
- Lalla-Roukh, Opéra comique de Félicien David, Illustrations pour piano, Op. 88 (1864)
- Fête polonaise, Mazurka, Op. 89 (1863)
- Chants des sirènes, Impromptu, Op. 91
- Alhambra, Polka-mazurka, Op. 92
- Noce arabe, Caprice, Op. 93
- Les Glanenses, Op. 96
- Chant de guerre, Op. 97
- Impromptu-mazurk, Op. 98 (c.1874)
- Polonaise brilliante, Op. 99
- Moïse, Final du 3ème acte, Op. 100
- Marche russe, Op. 101
- José-Maria, opéra-comique de Jules Cohen (c.1866)
- Flûte enchantée, Fantaisie, Op. 105
- Abd-el-Kader, Marche, Op. 106
- L'Addio, Grande valse, Op. 107 (1867)
- Carmosine, Polka-mazurka, Op. 108
- Eole, Valse brillante, Op. 109 (1867)
- Der Freischütz, Fantaisie, Op. 110
- Morceau de salon sur la célèbre valse Indiana de Marcailhou, Op. 112 (1867); paraphrase on Indiana, Grande valse by Gatien Marcailhou
- Freyschütz, de Weber, Fantaisie romantique, Op. 114 (1868)
- Dans les prés, Caprice, Op. 115 (1867)
- Caprice-mazurka, Op. 116
- Impromptu-valse, Op. 117 (1867)
- Patrouille, Ronde de nuit, Op. 118 (1869)
- Dimanche, Étude-vilanelle, Op. 119
- Léopold, Marsch, Op. 120 (1869)
- Berceuse orientale, Op. 121
- Tzigane-marche, Souvenir de Hongrie, Op. 122 (1868)
- Mazurka bohémienne, Op. 123
- Mélancolie, Op. 124 (1869)
- 3ème Nocturne, Op. 125 (1869)
- Sperata, Valse poétique, Op. 126
- Le Fuseau (Spindellied), Caprice-étude, Op. 127 (1869)
- Schnell, galop, Morceau facile, Op. 128
- La Madrilena, Mazurka brillante, Op. 129
- Viennoise (Wiener), Mazurka de salon, Op. 130
- Grande sonate en ut mineur, Op. 131 (1868)
- Chanson de l'esclave, Op. 132 (1869)
- Rienzi, opéra de R. Wagner, Fantaisie-militaire, Op. 133 (1869); paraphrase on Rienzi by Richard Wagner
- Cosaque, Polka, Op. 134
- Carnaval de Lima, Caprice Hispano-américain, Op. 136 (1870)
- Souvenir de l'exposition, Fantasia sur deux airs nationaux (1871)
- Souvenir de Marseille, Mazurka de salon (1872)
- La Coupe du Roi de Thulé, opéra de E. Diaz, Réminiscences et paraphrase (1873); paraphrase on La Coupe du Roi de Thulé by Eugène-Émile Diaz de la Peña (1837–1901)
- Marche nuptiale, Op. 137
- Fancy Fair, Mazurka de salon, Op. 138
- Carneval-Polka, Op. 139 (1874)
- 2ème Sonate in D major, Op. 140 (1874)
- Impromptu, Op. 141
- Salut au Hâvre, Marche solennelle, Op. 142
- Aïda, opéra de G. Verdi, Réminiscences et paraphrase, Op. 144 (1873); paraphrase on Aida by Giuseppe Verdi
- Chant de jeunes filles, Caprice, Op. 145 (1873)
- Fantaisie de salon sur Madame Turlupin, Op. 155; paraphrase on the opera Madame Turlupin by Ernest Guiraud
- 1er Nocturne, Op. 159
- Giovinetta, Mazurka, Op. 160
- 24 Études de genre dans le style moderne et dans tous les tons, Opp. 161–162 (1874)
- Messe de requiem de G. Verdi, Souvenir, Op. 164 (1874)
- Menuet du temps passé, Op. 165 (1874)
- Marietta, Caprice de genre, Op. 166 (1874)
- Reflets d'azur, Valse de salon, Op. 167 (1875)
- Régiment qui passe, Op. 171
- Capricciosa, Op. 172
- Hip! Hip! Hurrah!, Galop brilliant, Op. 173 (1875)
- À la voile, Barcarolle, Op. 174 (1875)
- Page d'album, Impromptu, Op. 175
- Carmencita, Op. 178
- Falstaff, Fantaisie-polka, Op. 179 (1876)
- Pensées d'automne, Impromptu, Op. 181 (1875)
- Le Régiment qui passe, Pas redoublé (1875)
- Marietta, Caprice de genre (1875)
- Capricciosa, Grande valse brillante (1875)
- 24 Études de genre dans le style moderne (1875)
- Pensées d'automne, Impromptu (1876)
- Six Sonatinas (1876)
- Souvenir de Prague, Polka, Op. 191 (1876)
- À la Strauss, Polka, Op. 192 (1876)
- Esmek-Meriem (Ton nom, c'est Marie), Chanson arabe (1876)
- Souvenir de Paul et Virginie, opéra de V. Massé, Fantaisie-caprice, Op. 200 (1876)
- 5ème Nocturne (1877)
- En rêvant, Valse-caprice (1877)
- Au bal, Impromptu-mazurk, Op. 201 (1877)
- En rêvant, Valse-caprice, Op. 202 (1877)
- Mazurk, Op. 203 (1878)
- Polonaise brillante, Op. 205 (1877)
- Véloce, Caprice-étude, Op. 206
- 24 Petite sonatines, très faciles dans tous les tons majeurs et mineurs, Op. 231
- À tire d'aile, Caprice, Op. 235 (1878)
- À toute volée, Galop brilliant, Op. 236 (1878)
- Marche bohémienne, Op. 238 (1878)
- Le Hamac, Chanson orientale, Op. 239
- 24 Pièces caractéristiques, Op. 240 (1877)
- Chanson de mai, Op. 243 (1878)
- Welcome au Prince de Galles, Valse brillante, Op. 244 (1878)
- Mazurk-Styrienne, Op. 250 (1880)
- Vienne, Ésquisse-valse (1878)
- Welcome au Prince de Galles, Valse brillante (1878)
- L'Étoile du nord, opéra-comique de G. Meyerbeer, Fantaisie de concert, Op. 275 (1878)
- À la mémoire de Beethoven, Hymne funèbre, Op. 302 (1879)
- Grande valse brillante, Op. 303 (1879)
- Aubade, Op. 305 (1879)
- Souvenir de Fatinitza, opéra comique de F. de Suppé, Fantaisie (1879)
- Souvenirs de Jean de Nivelle, de Delibes, Fantaisie de salon, Op. 308 (1880)
- Chanson mauresque, Op. 312
- Hongroise-polka (1881)
- Les Contes d'Hoffmann, opéra fantastique de J. Offenbach, Barcarolle (1881)
- Dors bébé, Berceuse, Op. 316 (1882)
- Claire fontaine, Caprice, Op. 317 (1882)
- Baiser de fleur, Grande valse de concert, Op. 318 (1883)
- 6ème Nocturne (1883)
- Marche des mousquetaires

== Sources ==
- Theodore Baker: A Biographical Dictionary of Musicians, 2nd edition (New York: Schirmer), 1905, p. 371
- John Denison Champlin, Jr.: Cyclopedia of Music and Musicians, volume 2 (New York: Charles Scribner's Sons, 1899), p. 504
- Janet M. Green: The American History and Encyclopedia of Music: Musical Biographies, volume 2, edited by William Lines Hubbard (New York: Irving Squire, 1910), p. 10
- Ernst Pauer: A Dictionary of Pianists and Composers for the Pianoforte (London and New York: Novello, Ewer & Co., 1895), p. 75.
