= Le Moulin de la Galette (Picasso) =

1900 painting by Pablo Picasso

- Artist: Pablo Picasso
- Year: 1900
- Medium: Oil on canvas
- Dimensions: 89.7 cm × 116.8 cm (35.3 in × 46.0 in)
- Location: Solomon R. Guggenheim Museum, New York

Le Moulin de la Galette is an oil painting on canvas (89.7 cm × 116.9 cm (35.3 in × 46.0 in)) created in 1900 by Pablo Picasso, and currently owned by the Guggenheim Museum in New York.

== History and description ==
In September 1900, 18-year-old Pablo Picasso arrived in Paris with his friend Carlos Casagemas for the Universal Exhibition. The subject of the work is a night scene in the famous Parisian nightclub Moulin de la Galette, crowded with people dancing, in the middle band, or resting at tables, in the lower left corner. Following Impressionist dictates, Picasso paints people not with meticulous precision, but as if they were large blobs of color in motion, under a pinwheel of artificial lights that appear to be floating. The tendency to deform images is evident in the arbitrary, bright and contrasting color as never before in the young Catalan artist's works. The brushwork is frayed and sinuous, with skillful light touches where the light beats, and with an already navigated mastery of the sense of movement, so that the fastest figures appear more blurred, just as in a photographic snapshot.

Four groups of characters stand out: the dancers in the center, in a whirling whirlwind; the couple with an androgynous figure in profile to the right, pale and elongated like a mask; then the three men in top hats on a platform to the left, who seem to be scouring the crowd in search of a companion; and finally the trio of women at the white table, two of whom are kissing and look as if they have just stepped out of a Toulouse-Lautrec painting, while the third rests her elbow on her arm and with her face carefully defined. This last figure winks and smiles, coquettishly escaping direct gaze with the viewer: she is Germaine Gargallo, a model he met in the Paris studio of the Barcelona painter Isidre Nonell, for whose unrequited love Carlos Casagemas would commit suicide shortly after Picasso returned to Spain.

The painting is at the Solomon R. Guggenheim Museum in New York, which received it as a gift from the art dealer Justin K. Thannhauser.

== Nazi-era restitution claim ==
In 2007 the heirs of Berlin banker Paul von Mendelssohn-Bartholdy demanded the return of "Le Moulin de la Galette" from the Guggenheim. The family made at the same time a claim against the Museum of Modern Art in New York (MoMa) for Picasso's Boy Leading a Horse. In response, both museums filed suit against the heirs, in December of 2007 in the Southern District Court of New York, asking the court to confirm the museums' ownership of the artworks, in Guggenheim Foundation v. Schoeps.

The case was widely commented on the American and international press because, as the Jerusalem Post observed "It was a highly anticipated case in which interim court rulings were parsed like Talmud because the museums are prominent, the paintings are famous, the Mendelssohn name looms large and the legal issues were significant to Nazi victims, museums and art collectors." The itinerary of the painting, in Germany in 1933, sold in Switzerland in 1936, transported to the US and later donated to a New York museum, posed issues of choice of law as well The case is generally known as Schoeps v. Museum of Modern Art and the R. Guggenheim Foundation. Julius H. Schoeps was the spokesperson for the Mendelssohn heirs.

The court rejected the museum's filing and ruled that the case could proceed to trial. However, before the trial could begin, the Guggenheim agreed on a settlement, the details of which remained secret. The confidentiality of the agreement was criticized by the judge in the case, Judge Rakoff.

== Curatorial discoveries ==
In 2023, in depth research into the canvas revealed hitherto unknown figures in the canvas.

== Bibliography ==
- Massimiliano De Serio e Francesca Toso, Picasso 1881-1914, collana I Classici dell'Arte, Rizzoli, Milano 2004.
