= Ferdinand Hiller =

German composer and conductor (1811–1885)

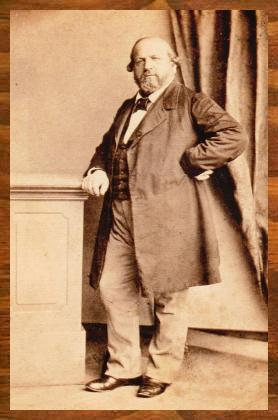

Ferdinand (von) Hiller (24 October 1811 – 11 May 1885) was a German composer, conductor, pianist, writer and music director.

== Biography ==
Ferdinand Hiller was born to a wealthy Jewish family in Frankfurt am Main, where his father Justus (originally Isaac Hildesheim, a name that he changed late in the 18th century to conceal his Jewish origins) was a merchant in English textiles – a business eventually continued by Ferdinand's brother Joseph. Hiller's talent was discovered early and he was taught piano by the leading Frankfurt musician Alois Schmitt, violin by Jörg Hofmann, and harmony and counterpoint by Georg Jacob Vollweiler; at 10 he performed a Mozart concerto in public; and two years later, he produced his first composition.

In 1822, the 13-year-old Felix Mendelssohn entered his life. The Mendelssohn family was at that time staying briefly in Frankfurt and the young Hiller visited them where he was immensely impressed by the playing of Felix (and even more so by that of his sister Fanny). When their acquaintance was renewed in 1825 the two boys found an immediate close friendship, which was to last until 1843. Hiller tactfully describes their falling out as arising from "social, and not from personal susceptibilities." But in fact it seems to have been more to do with Hiller's succession to Mendelssohn as director of the Leipzig Gewandhaus Orchestra in 1843.

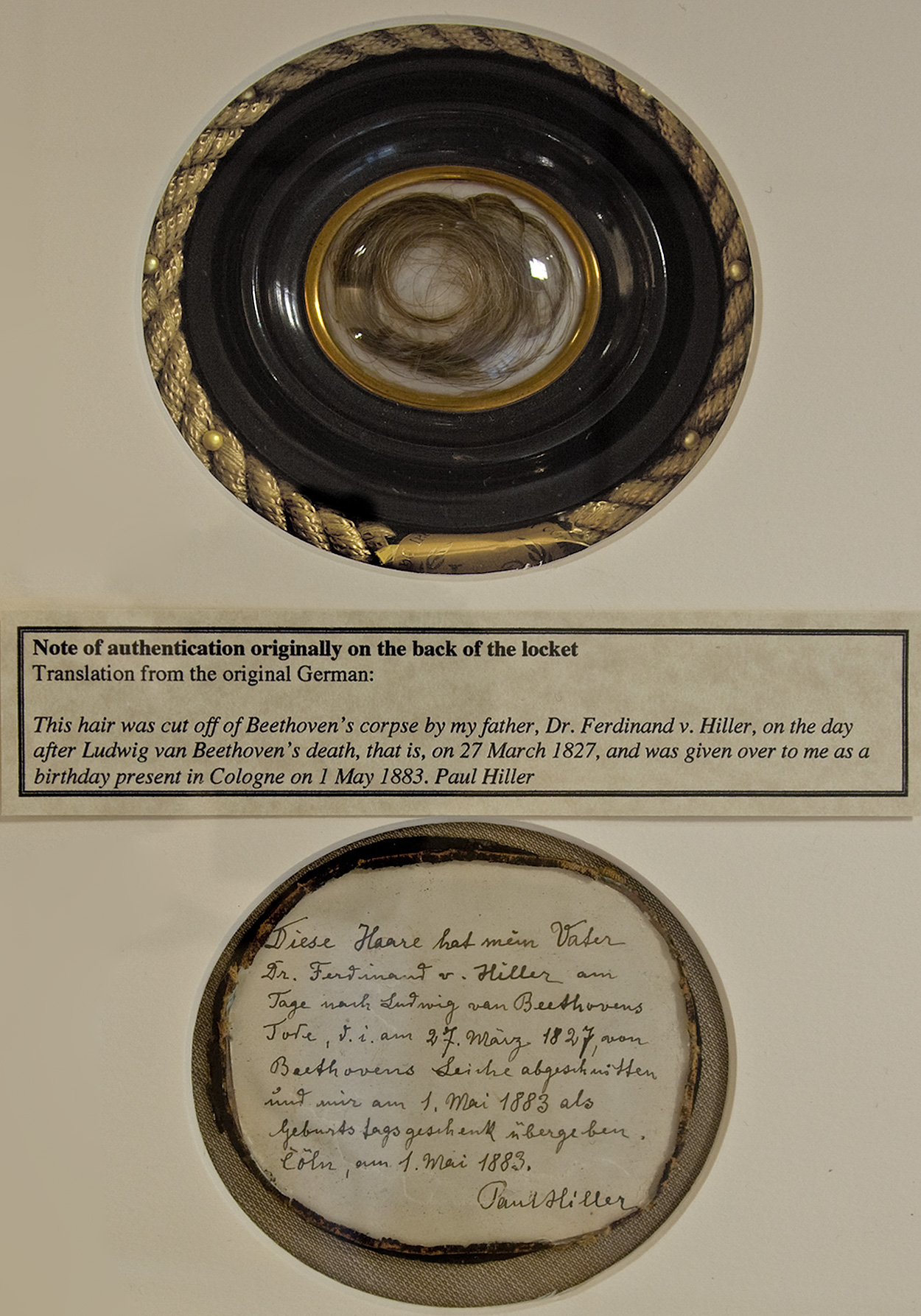
The lock of hair Hiller collected from Beethoven's deathbed. As seen at the Ira F. Brilliant Center for Beethoven Studies.

From 1825 to 1827, Hiller was a pupil of Johann Nepomuk Hummel in Weimar. Ferdinand Hiller's son, Paul Hiller (1853-1934), claimed to have received a lock of Beethoven's hair in 1883 as a birthday gift from his father. A replacement inscription on the back of the locket, dating to the lockets refurbishment in Cologne in 1911, reads, "This hair was cut off of Beethoven's corpse by my father, Dr. Ferdinand v. Hiller, on the day after Ludwig van Beethoven's death, that is, on 27 March 1827, and was given over to me as a birthday present in Cologne on 1 May 1883. Paul Hiller". However, Ferdinand Hiller does not record acquiring or owning a lock of Beethoven's hair, either in his diary entries during his visits to the dying Beethoven, or in his subsequent reminiscences. This lock, which has variously been named the Hiller Lock and/or Guevara Lock, was auctioned to members of the American Beethoven Society at Sotheby's in 1994. Three quarters of the hairs are retained by the Ira F. Brilliant Center for Beethoven Studies at San Jose State University, while a quarter of the hairs are held privately by the principal financial donor, Alfredo Guevara. In 2023, an ancient DNA analysis on five hair strands drawn from this lock was published, demonstrating that the hairs, while displaying DNA damage patterns indicative of their antiquity, nonetheless originated from a woman of Ashkenazi Jewish ancestry, and thus could not have been Beethoven's. While in Vienna for Beethoven's obsequies, Hiller and Hummel heard Johann Michael Vogl and Franz Schubert perform Schubert's Winterreise. Hiller wrote that his master was so moved that tears fell from his eyes.

From 1828 to 1836, Hiller based himself in Paris, where he was engaged as teacher of composition at Choron's School of Music. He eventually gave up his position so that he might better equip himself as a pianist and composer. In Paris, he met and became close friends with Frederic Chopin, Felix Mendelssohn, Giacomo Meyerbeer, Hector Berlioz, Vincenzo Bellini and Franz Liszt. Hiller’s relationship with Berlioz was particularly close and lifelong. It was marked by mutual respect despite their differing musical aesthetics. Hiller introduced Berlioz to Beethoven’s piano sonatas, was sympathetic to his struggles for recognition and was among those musicians who took his work seriously during its early, often controversial reception, while Berlioz valued Hiller’s musicianship and professionalism. In 1867, Hiller invited Berlioz to Cologne, where Berlioz conducted what proved to be his last concert in Germany.

In May 1834, Hiller travelled with Chopin – whom he described as "my pearl, my jewel, the object of my heart’s adoration" – to the Niederrheinisches Musikfest in Aachen. There, his arrangement of Handel’s oratorio Deborah was performed, and the two also met Mendelssohn again.

He spent time in Italy, hoping that this would assist him to write a successful opera (a hope which was never fulfilled). In 1836, he was in Frankfurt devoting himself to composition. His abilities were recognized, and although but 25, he was asked to act as conductor of the Cäcilienverein during the illness of its conductor Schelble.

In addition to Mendelssohn and Berlioz, he attracted the attention of Gioachino Rossini, who assisted him to launch his first opera, Romilda (which was a failure), at Milan. Mendelssohn obtained for Hiller an entrée to the Gewandhaus, and afforded an opportunity for the public presentation of Hiller's oratorio Die Zerstörung Jerusalems (The Destruction of Jerusalem, 1840). After a year of study in Church music at Rome, Hiller returned to Leipzig, and during the season of 1843–44 conducted the Gewandhaus concerts. By this time his position in the musical world was established, and honors and appointments were showered upon him. In 1845 Robert Schumann dedicated his piano concerto to Hiller. In 1847, Hiller became municipal kapellmeister of Düsseldorf, and in 1850 received a similar appointment at Cologne, where he founded Cologne Conservatoire that year and remained as Kapellmeister until 1884. During this time, he was twelve times festival director of the Lower Rhenish Music Festival, and conducted the Gürzenich concerts. He worked in Dresden as well. Thus he played a leading part in Germany's musical life. And he was conductor at the Italian Opera in Paris during the season of 1852–53.

During Hiller's long reign in Cologne, which earned him a 'von' to precede his surname, his star pupil was Max Bruch, the composer of the cello elegy Kol Nidrei, based on the synagogue hymn sung at Yom Kippur. Bruch was not Jewish; his knowledge of the theme of Kol Nidrei came through Hiller, who introduced him to the Berlin chazan, Lichtenstein. Hiller's regime at Cologne was strongly marked by his conservative tastes, which he attempted to prolong by recommending, as his successor in 1884, either Brahms or Bruch. The appointment went however to a "modernist", Franz Wüllner, who, according to Grove "initiated his term [...] with concerts of works by Wagner, Liszt and Richard Strauss, all of whom Hiller had avoided."

Hiller was elected a member of the Prussian Academy of Arts in 1849, and in 1868 received the title of doctor from the University of Bonn. In 1875, he was ennobled and added the prefix "von" to his name. He died in Cologne.

=== Personality ===
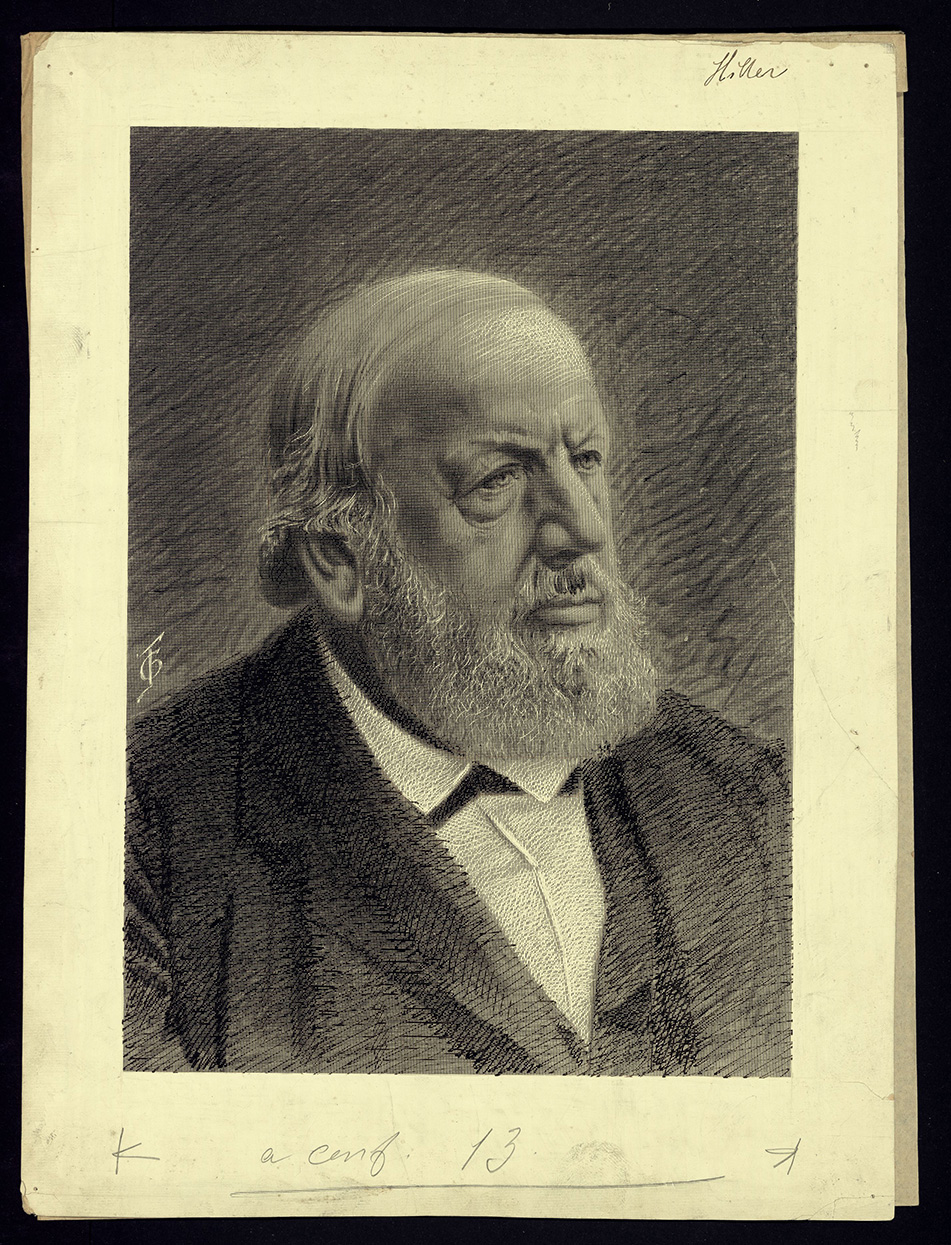
Portrait of Ferdinand Hiller, composer (1811–1885).

Hiller's affability was one of his strongest assets; he made innumerable friends, such as Charles-Valentin Alkan, Hector Berlioz, Franz Liszt, Robert Schumann, Frederic Chopin, Giacomo Meyerbeer and Felix Mendelssohn. His very extensive correspondence with all the leading musicians in Europe, still only partly published, is an important source for the musical history of his era. Yet another asset was his wife Antonka, by profession a singer, whom he married in Italy in 1840, and who made their home a magnet for the intelligentsia wherever they settled.

=== Hiller and Wagner ===
Hiller's time in Dresden marked his initial encounters with Richard Wagner, who had become deputy Kapellmeister there in 1843, following the success of the premiere of his opera Rienzi (staged in Dresden the previous year). In his autobiography, written during 1865–70 when he was settling scores, real and imaginary, following the death of Meyerbeer, Wagner is typically patronising about Hiller at this period, who, we are told, "behaved in a particularly charming and agreeable manner during those days." Antonka is described as "an extraordinary Polish Jewess who had caused herself to be baptised a Protestant together with her husband"; she is later shown as "enlist[ing] the support of a large number of her compatriots [...] for the opera of her husband." (The opera was Hiller's Konradin).

Wagner's dismissive remarks on Hiller throughout his autobiography Mein Leben and in his later review of Hiller's autobiography are not however representative of his relationship with Hiller as revealed through other documents. Wagner features quite frequently in Hiller's diary for the period. Amongst such notes are:

[30.11.1844] Wagner dropped by to my room [...] [15.1.1845] With Wagner at the Liedertafel [...] [24.2.1845] Wagner came to discuss his affairs. Discussion on religion with Wagner [...] [28.4.1845] Went through last two acts of Tannhäuser with Wagner [...]

and so forth. Hiller assisted with the staging of Tannhäuser in Dresden in October 1845. In November 1846 Hiller went to see Tannhäuser and notes "Mendelssohn is sitting in front of us" (but presumably no conversation took place). In 1847 he discusses his draft of his opera Konradin with Wagner.

== Works ==
Hiller's vast musical output is now more or less forgotten. It contained works in virtually every genre, vocal, choral, chamber and orchestral. Musically he is perhaps best remembered as the dedicatee of Schumann's Piano Concerto. He is also the dedicatee of the three Nocturnes, Op. 15, by Chopin. Hiller returned the favour by dedicating his Trois Caprices*, Op. 14, to him.

He composed among other works six operas between 1839 and 1865, a violin concerto, and incidental music to Karl August Görner's five-act play Prinz Papagei.

His large output of chamber music includes several quartets for strings with and without piano beginning with his Piano Quartet in B minor, Op. 1, published by Haslinger of Vienna in the 1830s, and at least three string quartets, a string trio published posthumously as Op. 207 in 1886 by Rieter-Biedermann of Leipzig, sonatas for solo piano (Op. 47, published in 1852 by Schuberth of Hamburg and Op. 59) and for piano with cello (at least two – Op. 22, published by Simrock, and Op. 174, published by Cranz), and a piano quintet (Op. 156), among other works. The fourth of his piano trios has been recorded along with the early piano trio of Max Bruch.

Hiller's three piano concertos are No. 1 in F minor, Op. 5 (Allegro moderato; Adagio; Allegro moderato e con grazia), No. 2 in F♯ minor, Op. 69 (Moderato, ma con energia e con fuoco; Andante espressivo; Allegro con fuoco), and No. 3 in A♭ major, Op. 170 ('Concerto Espressivo': Allegro con anima; Andante quasi adagio; Allegro con spirito).

Hiller wrote at least four symphonies; one by 1831, another, in A minor also by 1831; also Im Freien in G major, given in London 28 June 1852, and one in E minor published by Schott as his Op. 67 in Mainz in 1865.

He was also a very successful lecturer and a forceful writer, his contributions to reviews and newspapers having been since collected in book form. He also published among others: Musikalisches und Persönliches (1870), Wie hören wir Musik? (How do we hear [or: listen to] music?, 1880); Goethes musikalisches Leben (Goethe's musical life, 1880); and Erinnerungsblätter (Reminiscences, 1884). He published an account of his friendship with Mendelssohn in 1874. Part of his vast correspondence with other musicians and artists of his period, which is in itself an important historical archive, has been published in seven volumes.

== Recordings ==
Amongst recordings of Hiller's music are:

- The three piano concerti and Konzertstuck – Howard Shelley, conductor/pianist, Tasmanian Symphony Orchestra (Hyperion)
- A selection of the piano music on two CDs, including the three piano sonatas, the 24 etudes, Op.15, and two sets of variations, played by Adrian Ruiz (Genesis)
- A selection of the piano music, including the second and third sonatas, played by Alexandra Oehler (CPO)
- A selection of the piano music played by Tobias Koch (GENUIN classics)
- Symphonies in e minor and f minor by Brandenburgisches Staatsorchester Frankfurt, Howard Griffiths 2025 (CPO)
- Piano sonatas 1-3 and youth sonatas played by Oliver Drechsel on a Broadwood grand piano from 1865 (Edition Dohr, DCD039)
- Symphonies in E minor HWV 2.4.3 and C major HWV 2.4.6 by Brandenburgisches Staatsorchester Frankfurt conducted by Howard Griffiths (CPO CD 555682-2)
