= Anex (company) =

Baby products company

- Type: Private
- Industry: baby products
- Founded: 2012; 14 years ago
- Founder: Oleksandr Volynets
- Headquarters: Singapore, Singapore
- Number of locations: Singapore, Ukraine, Poland, China
- Area served: Worldwide (over 40 countries)
- Products: Strollers, car seats, high chairs, rockers, pet strollers, baby carriers, accessories
- Website: anexbaby.com

Anex is a global baby products brand founded in 2012. Headquartered in Singapore, the company specializes in the design and manufacture of strollers, car seats, high chairs, rockers, pet strollers, baby carriers, and related childcare accessories.

== History ==
Anex was founded in 2012 by Oleksandr Volynets. The company initially established its manufacturing base in Częstochowa, Poland. Production was later relocated to China. As of 2026, the company maintains offices in Singapore, Ukraine, Poland, and China, coordinating operations across more than 40 countries worldwide.

In 2016, Anex received the Kids' Time Star award in the "Strollers" category at the Kids' Time international trade fair in Kielce, Poland. The company would go on to win multiple Kids' Time Star awards over subsequent years. In 2017, Anex entered several European markets, including Germany, Italy, Spain, and Turkey. In 2018, the brand received the Targi Kielce Medal, an honour awarded by the Kielce Trade Fairs exhibition centre, for its presentation at the Kids' Time fair. In 2019, the Anex Air-X and Quant models received Red Dot Design Awards in the Product and Brands & Communication categories.

In 2021, Anex entered the United Kingdom. The brand was reviewed by UK consumer publications, including Which? and Mother & Baby. The same year, the company received a third Red Dot Design Award, for the Anex m/type PRO, a stroller designed for urban environments.

In 2025, Anex exhibited at Kind + Jugend, the international trade fair for baby and toddler products held annually in Cologne, Germany.

In 2026, three Anex products, the Flo stroller, the Ozy high chair, and the Modu, received iF Design Awards.
