= Georg Jacob Vollweiler =

German musician and teacher (1770–1847)

Georg Jacob Vollweiler (29 November 1770 – 17 November 1847) was a German musician, noted as a teacher. For a period he was manager of the London branch of Johann Anton André's publishing firm.

== Life ==
Vollweiler was born in Eppingen in 1770. From 1786 he received musical education in Heidelberg; he became an orchestral cellist and music teacher in Mannheim, and studied the theory of harmony.

He was a teacher of musical composition to Johann Anton André, son of the music publisher Johann André, in 1792–93. Other pupils include Ferdinand Hiller, Désiré Magnus, and Aloys Schmitt.

In 1805, Vollweiler moved to London, to manage a branch of the André publishing business established there by Philipp André, brother of Johann Anton André who now headed the business. Printing was by lithography, at that time a new process, which the firm called "polyautography". Vollweiler published several "specimens of polyautography" as well as music. In 1807, Johann Anton André closed the London business and Vollweiler returned to Germany; he continued to work for the firm in Offenbach am Main until 1818.

On 15 December 1811, he married Catharina Sieffert in Offenbach. Their son Carl Vollweiler (1813–1847) became a noted pianist and composer.

From 1828 to 1833, Vollweiler wrote reviews for the music periodical Caecilia. In 1844, he produced instruction books for beginners in piano-playing, and in singing, published by Schott.

He died in Heidelberg.
