= Howard Griffiths =

Howard Griffiths may refer to:

- Howard Griffiths (conductor) (born 1950), British conductor
- Howard Griffiths (scientist), British plant scientist
- Howard Griffiths (presenter), British television presenter
- Howard Griffiths (screenwriter) (1935–1999), Welsh-born screenwriter for Australian television shows

== See also ==
- Howard Griffith (born 1967), American football player
- Morgan Griffith (Howard Morgan Griffith, born 1958), American politician
