= Gustav Nicolai =

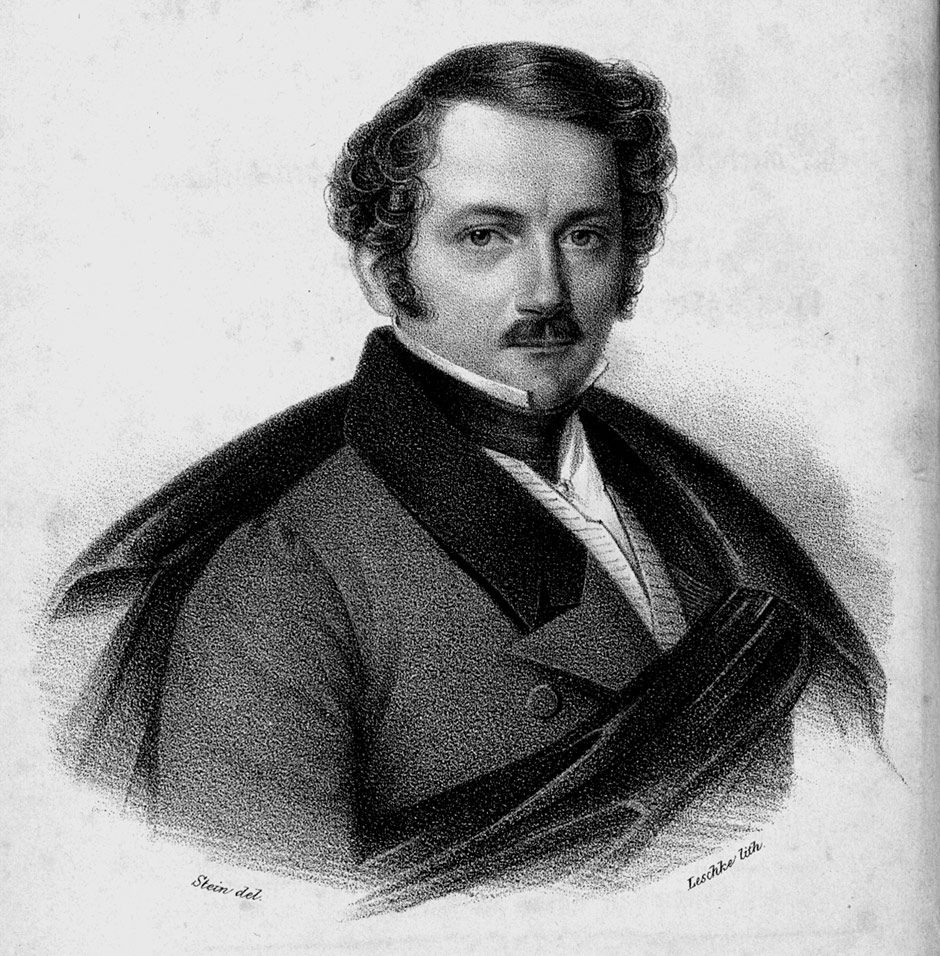
- Nicolai in 1835

Background information
- Born: Gustav Alexander Wilhelm Nicolai; 28 May 1795; Berlin, Kingdom of Prussia
- Died: 21 December 1868 (aged 73) Berlin, Kingdom of Prussia
- Occupations: Writer, composer

Gustav Alexander Wilhelm Nicolai (28 May 1795 – 21 December 1868) was a Prussian writer and composer.

== Career ==
Nicolai was born in Berlin to Friederike Sophie Riemer and her husband Carl Friedrich Wilhelm Nicolai, an Ober-Finanzrat (Upper Finance Council) member and director of the Prussian maritime trading company. He was educated in the Gymnasium in Königsberg in der Neumark, attending the Gymnasium and receiving instruction from the organist Gracht Unterricht. He returned to Berlin in 1812, spending a short time at the Graues Kloster and receiving piano lessons from Johann Philipp Schmidt. In 1813, he fought in the Napoleonic Wars and studied under Friedrich Wilhelm Berner in Breslau. From 1820 to 1843, he was Divisional Auditor in Berlin before becoming a private tutor.

His friends included the composers Adolf Bernhard Marx, Gaspare Spontini and Carl Loewe, for whom he wrote the oratorio libretto Die Zerstörung von Jerusalem, set to music by Loewe in 1833. Frederick William III of Prussia rewarded Nicolai with a golden box for the same libretto - the king was one of his prominent supporters, giving him the Gold Medal for Art and Science.

Nicolai became widely known for his travelogue, Italien wie es wirklich ist (Italy as it is, 1834), in which he critically described the country. He was heavily criticised, including by Friedrich Wilhelm Gubitz. Nicolai unsuccessfully sued for libel against the review Blätter für literarische Unterhaltung of 1 September 1834 (Nr. 244). The judgement made legal history, defining the right of literary criticism. Between 1835 and 1843, he corresponded with Robert Schumann and wrote several essays for the Neue Zeitschrift für Musik.

== Personal life ==
Nicolai's first marriage was to Henriette Dorothea May, and after her death, his second was to Leopoldine Concordia Cölestine Grothe (1817 – 11 July 1852). They had four children in 1833, 1834, 1836 and 1837 (who all died in infancy), followed by Arthur Gustav (1845–1846), Leontine Catherine Valerie (1848–1868) and Leontine Rosamunde (born 1850). He died in Berlin.

== Publications ==
- Die Geweihten, oder der Kantor von Fichtenhagen. Humoreske in zwei Theilen, Berlin: Schlesinger 1829; 2. Aufl. 1846
- Jeremias, der Volkscomponist, eine humoristische Vision aus dem 25sten Jahrhundert, Berlin: Wagenführ 1830
- Italien, wie es wirklich ist. Bericht über eine merkwürdige Reise in den hesperischen Gefilden als Warnungsstimme (für Alle, welche sich dahin sehnen), 2 Bände, Leipzig: Wiegand 1834 – 2. Aufl. 1835 (im Anhang zahlreiche Rezensionen der Erstauflage)
  - Band 1 (Digitalisat)
  - Band 2 (Digitalisat)
  - Neuausgabe der Erstausgabe von 1834, mit Anmerkungen versehen und ergänzt mit zeitgenössischen Kritiken und Dokumenten zum Rechtsstreit wegen Beleidigung. Berlin 2016, ISBN 978-3-945831-07-6.
- Arabesken für Musikfreunde, 2 Bände, Leipzig: Wigand 1835 (Digitalisat)

== Selected compositions ==
- op. 1: Die Sängerfahrt, ballad to a text by Ernst Schulze (1836)
- op. 2: Das Mädchen am Ufer (The Girl on the Shore), ballad after the English (1836)
- op. 3–7: Zwölf Balladen (Twelve Ballads) to a text by Ludwig Uhland (1837)

== Bibliography ==
- Carl Freiherr von Ledebur, Tonkünstler-Lexicon Berlin’s von den ältesten Zeiten bis auf die Gegenwart, Berlin 1861, S. 396f.
- Martin A. Völker, Wo die Zitronen blühen und die Flöhe beißen – Das Sehnsuchtsland Italien bei Gustav Nicolai (1795–1868) und Eduard Boas (1815–1853), in: Franciszek Grucza (Hrsg.), Akten des XII. internationalen Germanistenkongresses Warschau 2010. Vielheit und Einheit der Germanistik weltweit, Bd. 7, Frankfurt am Main: Lang 2012, S. 185–190
- Briefwechsel Robert und Clara Schumanns mit Korrespondenten in Berlin 1832 bis 1883, edited by Klaus Martin Kopitz, Eva Katharina Klein and Thomas Synofzik (Schumann-Briefedition, Serie II, Band 17), Cologne: Dohr 2015, S. 473–489, ISBN 978-3-86846-028-5
