= Salomon Ludwig Steinheim Institute =

German research institute

Coordinates: 51.4562°N 7.0170°E

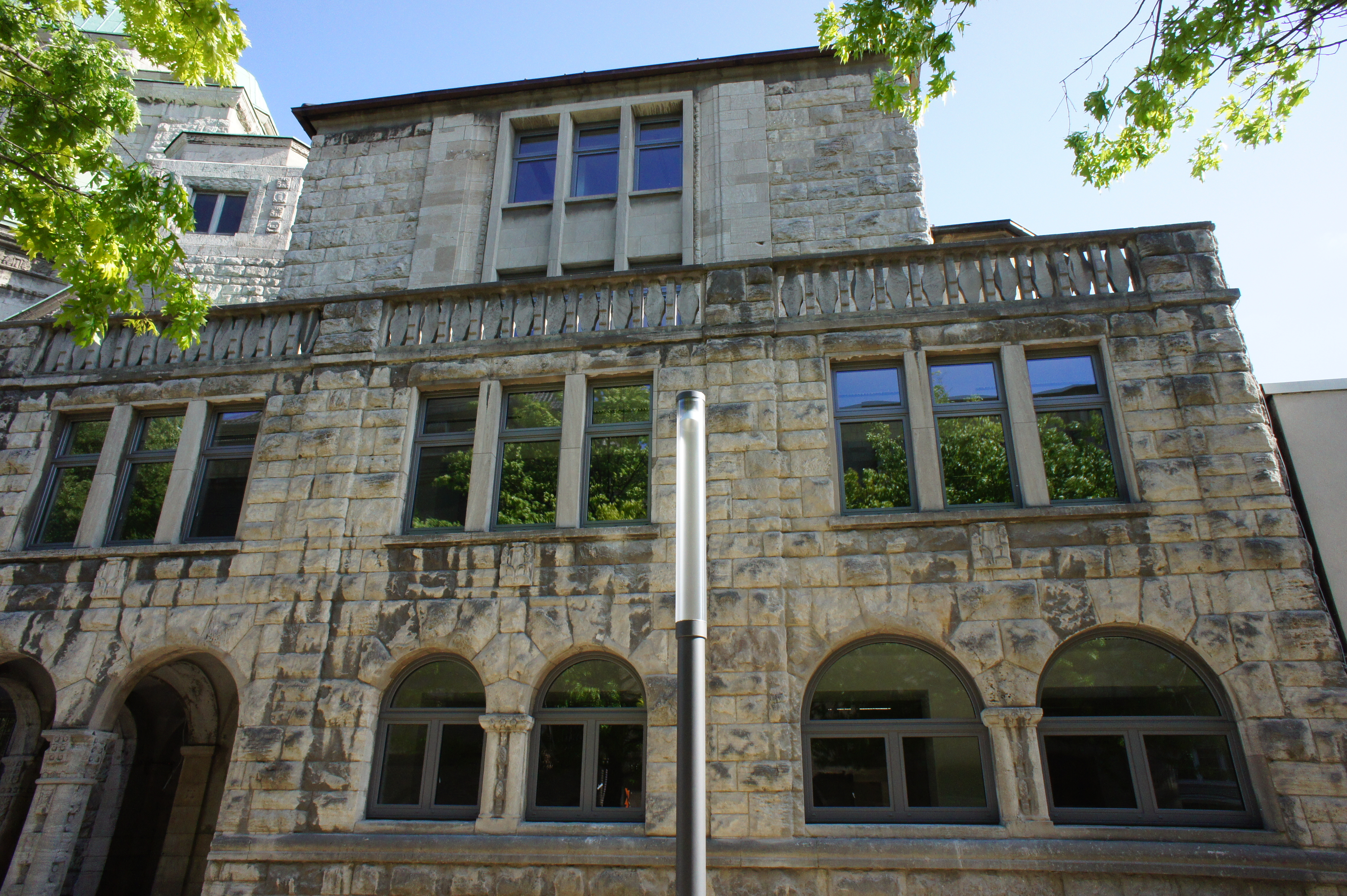
The building housing the institute

The Salomon Ludwig Steinheim Institute of German-Jewish Studies is a research institute of the University of Duisburg-Essen whose research focuses on the cultural and religious history as well as the history of literature and events of the Jewish community in German-speaking areas. The institute has made contributions in teaching in the field of Jewish Studies at the University of Duisburg-Essen. In 2003, the faculty was transferred to the Heinrich Heine University of Düsseldorf and cooperation with the institute has been maintained.

== Publications ==
- Kalonymos
- Netiva
- Zutot
- Minima Judaica
- Haskala name derived from Haskala.
- Menora name based on Menorah
