= Arnold (surname) =

Arnold is a surname in many cutures, including German and English, originating, along with many other similar names, from a Germanic dithematic given name based on stems arn, 'eagle' and waltan, 'to rule'. The Dictionary of American Family Names claims that the origin is the Ancient Germanic name Arnwald.

Notable people with the surname include:

- A. Otis Arnold (1878–1941), American businessman and politician
- Alice Arnold (disambiguation), several people
- Ann Arnold (1936–2015), English artist
- Anthony Arnold (1896–1954), British flying ace
- Augusta Foote Arnold (1844–1904) American naturalist and author
- Ben Arnold (disambiguation), several people
- Bené Arnold (1935–2024), American dance scholar
- Benedict Arnold (disambiguation), several people

- Benedict Arnold (1741–1801), American Revolution general, defected to Britain
- Benedict Arnold (congressman) (1780–1849), American politician from New York
- Benedict Arnold (governor) (1615–1678), governor of the Rhode Island colony

- Benjamin Arnold (disambiguation), several people
- Bill Arnold (disambiguation), several people
- Billy Arnold (disambiguation), several people
- Bogdan Arnold (1933–1968), Polish serial killer
- Brad Arnold (1978–2026), American musician, 3 Doors Down singer
- Carl Arnold (American football), American football coach
- Carl Arnold (composer) (1794–1873), German composer
- Catherine Arnold (born 1978), British diplomat
- Cecile Arnold (1893–1931), American silent film actress
- Cedric Arnold (1907–1980), English organ-builder
- Charles Arnold-Baker (1918–2009), English member of MI6, barrister, and historian
- Clinton E. Arnold (born 1958), American New Testament scholar
- Cornelius Arnold (1711–1757?), American poetical writer
- David Arnold (disambiguation), several people
- Delia Arnold (born 1986), Malaysian squash player
- Dominique Arnold (born 1973), American hurdling athlete
- Dorothy Arnold (actress) (1917–1984), American film actress
- Douglas N. Arnold, American mathematician
- Đuro Arnold (1853–1941), Croatian writer and philosopher
- Dutee Arnold (1763–1849), Justice of the Rhode Island Supreme Court
- Dylan Arnold (born 1994), American actor
- Earl C. Arnold (1884–1949) American academic administrator
- Eberhard Arnold (1883–1935), German writer, philosopher, and theologian
- Eddy Arnold (1918–2008), American country music singer
- Eduardo Arnold (born 1947), Argentine politician
- Edward Arnold (disambiguation), several people
- Edward Vernon Arnold (1857–1926), British scholar of Sanscrit and Latin
- Sir Edwin Arnold (1832–1904), English poet and journalist
- Edwin Lester Arnold (1857–1935), English author
- Edwin Nicholas Arnold (1940–2023), British herpetologist
- Elana K. Arnold, children's and young adult author
- Elliott Arnold (1912–1980), American novelist and screenwriter
- Ethel Arnold (1865 –1930), English journalist, author, and lecturer on female suffrage
- Florence Arnold (born 1988), English singer, songwriter and drummer, known as Florrie
- Frances Arnold (born 1956), American chemical engineer and Nobel laureate
- F. T. Arnold (1861–1940), Anglo-German musicologist and bibliophile
- Frank Arnold (disambiguation), several people
- Franz Arnold (1878–1960), German comedy writer
- Franz Xaver Arnold (1774–1841), Swiss politician
- Frieda Arnold (fl. 1854–1859), British courtier, dresser (lady's maid) to Queen Victoria of Great Britain
- Friedrich Arnold (1803–1890), German anatomist
- Friedrich Wilhelm Arnold (1810–1864), German musician, music seller, publisher and folk-song collector
- Geoff Arnold (born 1944), English cricketer
- Georg Arnold-Graboné (1896–1982), German painter and art teacher
- George William Arnold, American telecoms protocol engineer
- Gillian Arnold (born 1971), British artist
- Godfrey Edward Arnold (1914–1989), Austrian American professor of medicine
- Gordon Arnold (1941–1997), alleged witness to John F. Kennedy's assassination
- Gottfried Arnold (politician) (1933–2015), German politician
- Graham Arnold (born 1963), Australian football player and manager
- Grayland Arnold (born 1997), American football player
- Harriet Pritchard Arnold (1858–1901), American author
- Heinz Arnold (1919–1945), German World War II fighter pilot
- Helen Arnold (1890–1976), silent film actress
- Henry H. Arnold (1886–1950), American aviation pioneer and commanding general
- Hollie Arnold (born 1994), British parasport athlete
- Horace Lucian Arnold (1837–1915), American writer on management
- Ian Arnold (born 1972), English football player
- Isaac N. Arnold (1815–1884), congressman during American Civil War and biographer of Abraham Lincoln
- Iwan Arnold (born 1991), Swiss ski mountaineer
- Jack Arnold (disambiguation), several people
- James Arnold (disambiguation), several people
- Jamie Arnold (disambiguation), several people
- Jay Arnold (1912–1982), American football player
- Jennette Arnold, Montserrat-born British politician
- Jim Arnold (disambiguation), several people
- Joanne Arnold (born 1931), American actress and model
- Joe Arnold (born 1947), American baseball coach
- John Arnold (disambiguation), several people
- Johann Georg Daniel Arnold (1780–1829), German writer
- Johann Gottfried Arnold (1773–1806), German cellist
- Jonathan Arnold (1741–1793), American physician and statesman
- Jonathan Earle Arnold (1814–1869), Wisconsin politician
- Josef Anton Arnold (1765–1821), Swiss politician
- Josiah D. Arnold (1820–1903), American businessman and politician
- June Arnold (1926–1982), American author and feminist activist
- Julian Arnold (born 1991), American professional pickleball players
- Karl Arnold (disambiguation), several people
- Katherine Juhan-Arnold, American politician
- Ken Arnold (born 1958), American computer programmer and developer of Rogue
- Kenneth Arnold (1915–1984), American aviator, noted for his UFO sighting
- KK Arnold (born 2005), American basketball player
- Lenna Arnold (1920–2010), American baseball player
- Leslie Arnold (1942–2010), American murderer and long-term fugitive
- Lucas Arnold Ker (born 1974), Argentine tennis player
- Luke Arnold (born 1984), Australian actor
- Mackenzie Arnold (born 1994), Australian footballer
- Sir Malcolm Arnold (1921–2006), English composer and symphonist
- Marc Arnold (born 1970), South African football player
- Margery Arnold (fl. mid 14th century), landowner
- Martin Arnold (disambiguation), several people
- Matthew Arnold (1822–1888), English poet and cultural critic
- Maximilian Arnold (born 1994), German footballer
- Monica Denise Arnold (born 1980), American singer, known as Monica
- Nathan Arnold (born 1987), English football player
- Nicholas Arnold (disambiguation), several people
- Nick Arnold (footballer) (born 1993), English football player
- Nick Arnold (writer) (born 1961), British writer
- Nicky Arnstein (1879–1965), alias Nick and Nicholas Arnold
- Norbert P. Arnold (1920–2014), American politician and inventor
- P. P. Arnold (born 1946), American soul singer
- Patricio Arnold (born 1971), Argentine tennis player
- Rainer Arnold (born 1950), German politician
- Ralph Arnold (1906–1970), British author and publisher
- Ralph Arnold (1928–2006), American artist and educator
- Rich Arnold (born 1945), Iowa state representative
- Richard Arnold (disambiguation), several people
- Richie Arnold (born 1990), Australian rugby union player
- Robert Arnold (disambiguation), several people
- Ronald Arnold (1908–1963), British engineer
- Russ Arnold (1921–2012), American bridge player
- Russel Arnold (born 1973), Sri Lankan cricketer
- Samuel Arnold (disambiguation), several people
- Sheldon Arnold (born 2002), American football player
- Stanley Arnold (1903–1984), American politician
- Stanley P. V. Arnold (1856–1901), American politician and newspaper editor
- Tabitha Arnold (born 1995), American artist
- Tom Arnold (disambiguation), several people
- Thomas Arnold (disambiguation), several people
- Trent Alexander-Arnold (born 1998), English football player
- Victor Arnold (disambiguation), several people
- Villiers Arnold (1876–1921) actor and singer in Gilbert and Sullivan operas
- Vladimir Arnold (1937–2010), Russian mathematician
- Wayne Arnold (born 1984), American basketball player
- Werner Arnold (weightlifter) (1931–2025), German weightlifter
- William Arnold (disambiguation), several people

== See also ==
- Arnold (disambiguation)
- Arnold (given name)
