= David Arnold (disambiguation) =

David Arnold (born 1962) is an English film composer.

David Arnold may also refer to:

- David Arnold (American football) (born 1966), football defensive back
- David Arnold (basketball) (born 1990), American basketball player
- David Arnold (conductor) (born 1951), British composer, conductor and music producer
- David Arnold (historian) (born 1946), British historian
- David Arnold (mathematician) (1939–2021), American mathematician
- David Arnold, candidate in the United States House of Representatives elections in Missouri, 2010
- David A. Arnold (1968–2022), American stand-up comedian
- J. David Arnold, professor of psychology
- David Arnold, vicar of St Paul's Church, Adlington
- Dave Arnold (born 1971), American chef and museum founder
- Dave Arnold (American football) (born 1944), football coach
- Dave Arnold (politician) (1971–2021), American politician from Pennsylvania
