= George William Arnold =

American telecoms protocol engineer

George William Arnold from the National Institute of Standards & Technology, Gaithersburg, Maryland was named Fellow of the Institute of Electrical and Electronics Engineers (IEEE) in 2012 for leadership in architecture and protocols for the electric grid and telecommunications network.
