= Richard Arnold =

Richard Arnold may refer to:

- Richard Arnold (chronicler) (died c. 1521), English antiquary and chronicler
- Richard Arnold (executive) (born 1971), British accountant and director at Manchester United
- Richard Arnold (general) (1828–1882), major general in the American Civil War
- Richard Arnold (judge) (born 1961), British judge
- Richard Arnold (politician) (born 1959), German politician
- Richard Arnold (presenter) (born 1969), British television presenter and personality
- Richard Arnold (speaker) (1642–1710), politician from Rhode Island
- Richard Alexander Arnold, professor of English at Alfaisal University
- Richard R. Arnold (born 1963), American astronaut
- Richard S. Arnold (1936–2004), judge of U.S. Court of Appeals for the Eighth Circuit
- Richard Arnold (died 1647), English soldier executed after the Corkbush Field mutiny
- Richard Dennis Arnold, mayor of Savannah, Georgia
- Richard Arnold (rugby union), New Zealand rugby union player
- Richie Arnold, Australian rugby union player

== See also ==
- Rich Arnold (born 1945), Iowa state representative
