= Samuel Arnold =

Samuel Arnold may refer to:

- Samuel Arnold (composer) (1740–1802), English composer and organist
- Samuel Arnold (Connecticut politician) (1806–1869), U.S. Representative from Connecticut
- Samuel Arnold (conspirator) (1834–1906), co-conspirator of a plot to kidnap U.S. President Abraham Lincoln
- Samuel G. Arnold (1821–1880), U.S. Senator from Rhode Island
- Samuel James Arnold (1774–1852), English dramatist
- Samuel W. Arnold (1879–1961), U.S. Representative from Missouri
- Samuel Arnold (actor) (born 1992), French actor
