= Nicholas Arnold =

Nicholas or Nick Arnold may refer to:

== Politicians ==
- Nicholas Arnold (lord justice) (1507–1580), English courtier and politician
- Nicholas Arnold (MP for Monmouthshire) (1600–1665)

== Others ==
- Nick Arnold (writer) (born 1964), British writer of science books for children
- Nick Arnold (footballer) (born 1993), English association footballer
- Nicky Arnstein (1879–1965), alias Nick and Nicholas Arnold
- Edwin Nicholas Arnold (1940–2023), British herpetologist at the Natural History Museum, London
