= Tabitha Arnold =

American artist (born 1995)

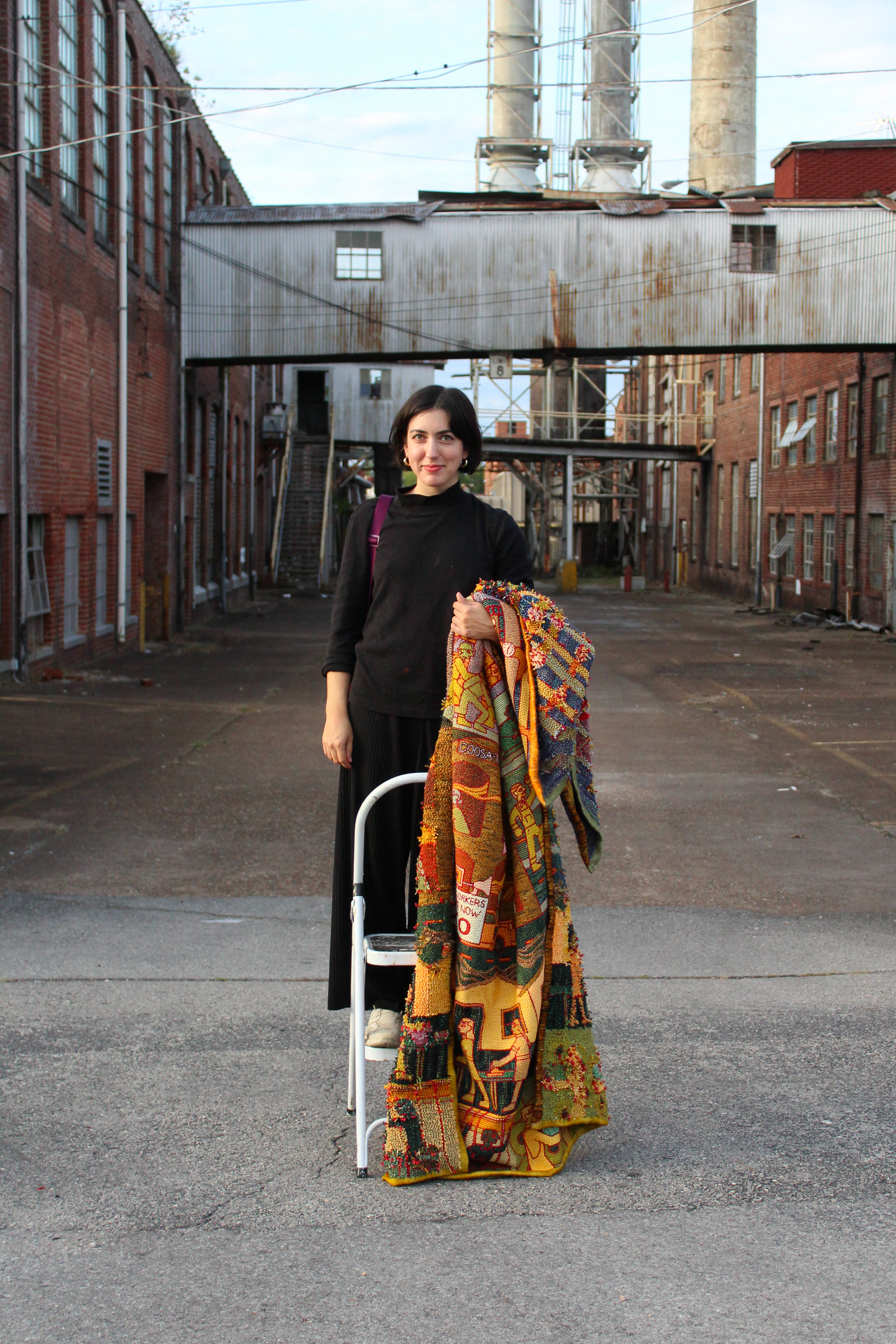
- Arnold holding her work "Mill Town"
- Born: July 26, 1995 (age 30); Chattanooga, Tennessee, U.S.
- Education: Pennsylvania Academy of the Fine Arts (BFA)
- Known for: Textile arts, union labor organizing
- Awards: 2025 Southern Prize for Visual Arts
- Website: www.tabithaarnold.com

Tabitha Arnold (born 1995) is an American visual artist and labor organizer, specialized in textile art, particularly tapestries and punch needle embroidery. Her work is inspired by the history of the labor movement, as well as her own direct experiences as a worker and organizer.

Arnold was a 2023 MacDowell Fellow in visual arts, and her work has been acquired by and displayed in different institutional collections internationally such as the Boston Museum of Fine Arts, and the Dom Museum in Vienna. She was also the recipient of the 2025 Southern Prize for visual arts.

She attended the Pennsylvania Academy of the Fine Arts, and graduated with a BFA degree in 2017. Arnold was involved with the labor organization Philly Workers for Dignity, from 2019 to 2022.

== Exhibitions ==
- Woodmere Annual (2018), group exhibition at the Woodmere Art Museum, Philadelphia, Pennsylvania
- Workshop of the World (2024), at the List Gallery, Swarthmore College, Swarthmore, Pennsylvania
- Gospel of the Working Class (2025), at the Institute of Contemporary Art, Chattanooga, Tennessee
- Gospel of the Working Class (2025), at the Field Projects Gallery, New York City, New York
