= Martin Arnold =

Martin Arnold may refer to:

- Martin Arnold (composer) (born 1959), Canadian composer
- Martin Arnold (filmmaker) (born 1959), Austrian experimental filmmaker
- Martin Arnold (journalist) (1929–2013), American journalist
