= Victor Arnold =

Victor Arnold refers to:

- Victor Arnold (Austrian actor) (1873–1914)
- Victor Arnold (American actor) (1936–2012)
