= Robert Arnold =

Robert Arnold may refer to:

- Robert Arnold (basketball) (born 1988), basketball player
- Robert Arnold (MP) (died c. 1408), English politician, MP for Winchelsea
- Jake Arnold (athlete) (Robert Jacob Arnold, born 1984), American decathlete
- Robert O. Arnold, chairman of the Georgia Board of Regents during integration
- Robert Sterling Arnold (1905–2003), American shape note music publisher, singer, composer, and singing school teacher
- Bob Arnold (1910–1998), English voice actor
- Rob Arnold (born 1980), Chimaira member
