= Margery Arnold =

Margery Arnold (fl. mid 14th century) was an English landowner associated with the estate known as Armholt Wood, later known as Arnolds and then Arno's, and which became the modern Arnos Grove. She is mentioned in the feet of fines (records of land transactions) of King Edward III.
