= Georg Arnold-Graboné =

German painter

Georg Arnold-Graboné (also Arnold Grabone; 11 September 1896 – 10 February 1982) was a painter of German impressionism and an art teacher. Because Grabone is not his real surname, sometimes his name appears as Georg Arnold-Graboné.

== Biography ==
=== Early life ===
Born in Munich on 11 September 1896, Arnold was the son of the Regional-President Wilheim von Arnold. He went to study at the Academy of Fine Arts, Munich. In 1914, the young Arnold passed his Abwalt (exit examination), and volunteered as an enlistee in the German Army. While serving in World War I, he suffered a head injury from a grenade explosion. The injury left him temporarily without hearing or speech. Because of his injuries he was discharged from the army. He returned to his Swabian homeland.

=== Maturity ===
Without the benefit of any additional schooling, Arnold began to paint everything he saw. Although his speech and hearing returned, he could not abandon his love of painting. He began to study formally at the State Academy of Fine Arts Stuttgart and then studied Cubism at the Academy of Fine Arts Vienna under Professor Lippert. Here he became a member of a circle of painters known as the "Licht-Gruppe".

Arnold abandoned these experimental forms and returned to more traditional painting. Some years later he would write "Ich bin kein freund der Abstracten kunst" (I am no friend of abstract art). After studying at the Academy of Fine Arts Vienna, Arnold returned to the Academy of Fine Arts, Munich, where he studied landscape painting under Heinrich von Zügel and Leo von Konig. After studying in Munich, he moved to the Prussian Academy of Arts in Berlin where he further refined his painting style under the well-known German impressionist Max Liebermann. Arnold once wrote that Liebermann made him into a true painter. On his stylistic naturalism, Arnold once wrote: "Ich gebe die Stimmung der Landschaft so wieder, wie ich sie emfinde und wie sie auch der Betrachter empfinden soll" (I show the texture of the landscape in the way that I feel it and, as also how I want the viewer to feel it)

In 1928, Arnold was awarded a gold medal in Vienna for his oil painting: Hardanger Fjord. In 1932, he moved to Zurich University of the Arts for teaching where he later became Rector.

In 1936, he began to use the name Graboné as a "Künstlername" rather than Arnold. Graboné was derived from Garabronn, the place which contained his family home. His painter friends included Otto Pippel and Franz Xavier Woffel. Although he was financially successful as a painter, Arnold painted because of his love of the aesthetic. Once, it is told, he traded a painting for taxi fare.

=== Relationship with Eisenhower and Churchill ===
In 1951 U.S. General Dwight D. Eisenhower was stationed in Garmisch as the commander of occupied Europe. Sir Winston Churchill encouraged Eisenhower to take up painting as a hobby. Eisenhower followed Churchill's advice and began to take lessons from Arnold-Graboné. At that time Arnold-Graboné had his studio only a few miles from Eisenhower's headquarters. For a period of time Eisenhower flew twice-weekly from Paris to Fürstenfeldbruck, and then by automobile to Tutzing where he took his art lessons from the professor. They formed a friendship and one of Arnold-Graboné's paintings hung in the White House. Later the former president hung one of the paintings, "Zugspitze" in his home in Gettysburg. .

Arnold-Graboné's circle of American friends acquired at NATO headquarters also included General Nordstrom and Robert L. Scott (author of "God is my copilot"). The artist marketed his works to the junior officers stationed at NATO headquarters, and he often invited them to exhibitions his work. As a consequence, many young American officers purchased paintings and brought them back to the United States.

Through Eisenhower, Arnold-Graboné eventually became acquainted with Sir Winston Churchill. Churchill was interested in the artist's spatula technique and asked him for some tutelage. The two of them spent several weeks one summer in the early 1950s painting together on the Isle of Man.

Although he maintained his studio in Tutzing the artist exhibited throughout the world. In the 1950s and 1960s Arnold-Graboné had exhibitions in the United States, including New York City, Chicago, Washington DC and Sarasota, Florida. Former President Lyndon B. Johnson owned in his private collection an original Graboné titled "Arber".

=== Death ===
After a fight with cancer, Arnold-Graboné died on 10 February 1982, near Starnberg in Bavaria. He was survived by his wife, Sofie, their one son, Warner, his daughter Renate Arnold (Renee Dow and Renee Hubbell) from his previous marriage, and his two grandsons, Robert Dow and Thomas Dow. His great-grandchildren, Patrick Cooper Dow and Jack Alexander Dow.

== Artistic style ==
Arnold-Graboné became well known for his unique style of Palette knife painting. His technique used the texture of thickly applied paint to create an actual three-dimensional representation of a landscape. In Graboné's works, the colors are remarkable for their brilliance, distinguishing his landscapes from those of other pallet-knife painters. The brilliance is a result of Graboné's color-separation technique in knife-painting. His favorite subjects were of the Alps of Bavaria and South Tirole, the Isle of Capri, the English Garden in Munich, the lake region surrounding Starnberg, and fishing boats on the North Sea. His unusual signature is incised into the wet paint with the opposite end of the brush, almost invariably on the bottom left hand of his oil paintings (and on the bottom right for watercolors).

== See also ==
- Max Liebermann
- Dwight D. Eisenhower
- Winston Churchill
- List of German painters
