= Ralph Arnold =

American artist and educator

Ralph Arnold (December 5, 1928 – May 10, 2006) was an American artist and educator from Chicago, Illinois.

== Education and military service ==
Arnold briefly attended University of Illinois at Urbana-Champaign before enlisting in U.S. Army and serving in Korea from 1950 to 1952. Returning to Chicago, Arnold met William Frederick, a silversmith teacher at the School of the Art Institute of Chicago. Arnold and Frederick became partners, and would remain together until Arnold's death more than fifty years later. Frederick encouraged Arnold to experiment with various artistic mediums in classes at the Art Institute. Arnold subsequently completed an undergraduate degree in 1955 at Roosevelt University; in 1976 he earned an M.F.A. from the Art Institute of Chicago.

== Career ==
Arnold developed an artistic practice that utilized collage and assemblage to address and explore American popular culture. In 1966, Arnold began his involvement with the South Side Community Art Center, exhibiting individual works and serving as a juror for group exhibitions, followed by a solo retrospective his work in 1973. In the late 1960s Arnold was an Artist in Residence at Art & Soul, a collaborative art space in North Lawndale initiated by the Museum of Contemporary Art and CVL, Inc. – the latter being a new configuration of the Vice Lords, a West Side street gang.

In 1969, Arnold began a position as an assistant professor of painting at Rockford University, followed by work at Barat College in Lake Forest, Illinois. In 1972 Arnold joined the Fine Arts Department at Loyola University Chicago. He was an influential facility member at Loyola, named chairman of the art department, and remained at the university through 2000. During his time at Loyola, Arnold was a member of the Illinois Arts Council, on the Advisory Board of the Illinois Arts Alliance, and served as an adjunct lecturer at the Art Institute of Chicago.

In 2006, the Pauls Foundation created two scholarship funds in memory of Arnold at Loyola University and at Chicago Academy for the Arts. The Ralph Arnold Fine Arts Annex and the Ralph Arnold Gallery at Loyola University are named in his honor.

In 2020, a website was started to celebrate the life and art of Ralph Moffett Arnold.

Arnold's work was included in the 2025 exhibition Photography and the Black Arts Movement, 1955–1985 at the National Gallery of Art.
