= Johann Georg Daniel Arnold =

German poet (1780–1829)

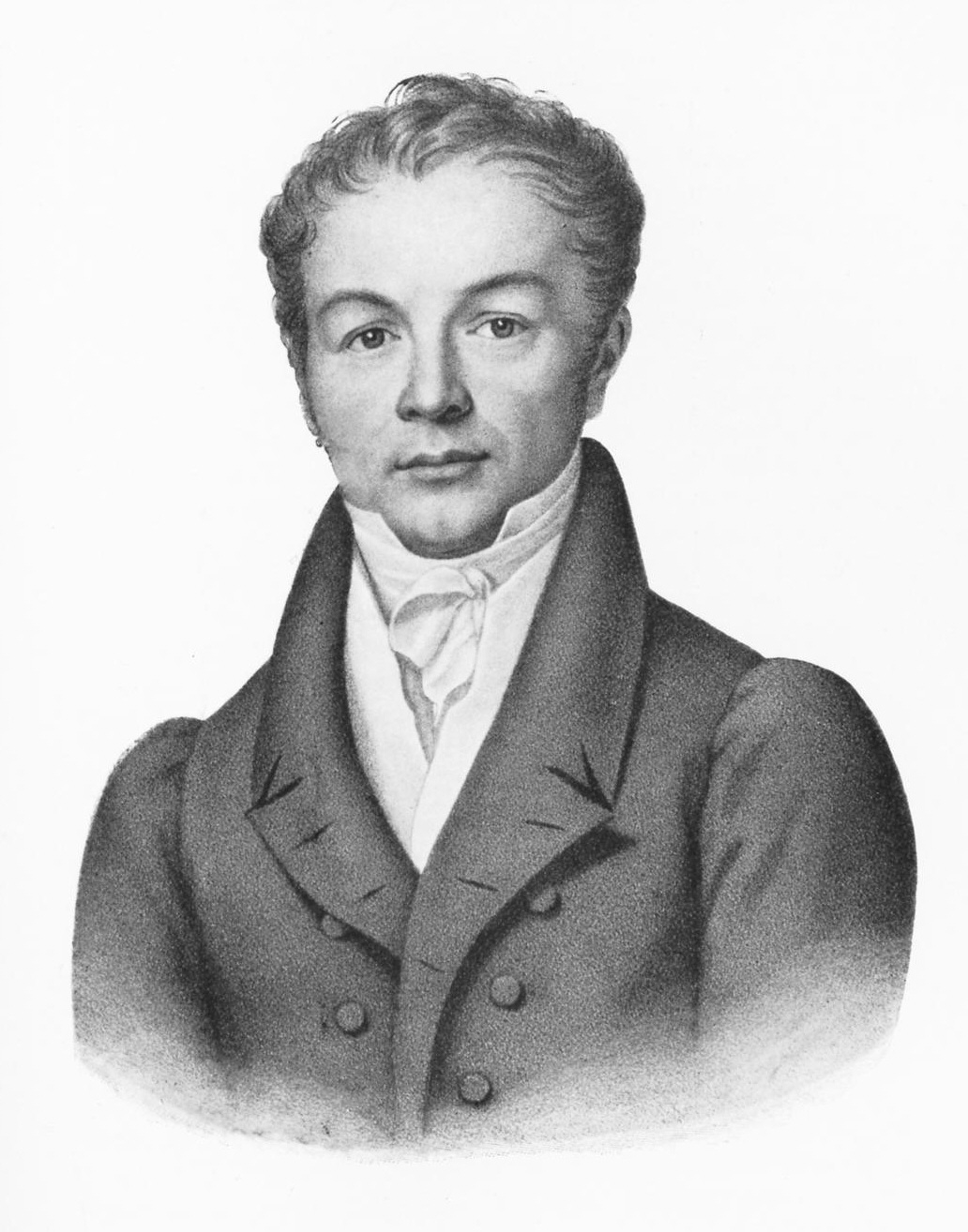
Johann Georg Daniel Arnold

Johann Georg Daniel Arnold (18 February 1780, in Strasbourg – 18 February 1829, in Strasbourg) was a lawyer and writer.

== Life ==
Arnold was born the son of a master cooper. His mother died very early. From 1787 Arnold attended high school in Strasbourg. Due to the French Revolution, the family became impoverished and from 1795 he hired himself as a clerk in the war bureau of the Bas-Rhin department.

After the turmoil of the revolution, Braun, Herrnschneider, Johann Schweighäuser, the lawyer Christoph Wilhelm von Koch, the pedagogue Johann Friedrich Oberlin and the theologians Jean Laurent Blessig and Isaak Haffner established the Protestant Academy in Strasbourg, a kind of free university at which no school fees were paid by the students was raised. In 1798, a year after his father's death, Arnold attended this private college.

From 1801 to 1803 Arnold studied law and history at the University of Göttingen. During this time a study trip to Berlin, Hamburg, and Dresden also took place. On the return trip to Strasbourg he visited Friedrich Schiller in Jena and Johann Wolfgang von Goethe in Weimar.

After only a short stay in Strasbourg, he traveled on to Paris. There he visited his former teacher, Koch, who had meanwhile become a member of the tribunal. Arnold was hoping for a professorship from him at one of the newly established universities.

Since Koch could not help him, Arnold started disappointed in June 1804 on a tour of Italy via Geneva, Milan, Genoa, and Florence to Rome, on to Naples, Venice, Turin and back to Paris.

In April 1806 Arnold became professor of civil law at the University of Koblenz by imperial decree (professor of the civil code at the Koblenz School of Law). In 1809, the Koblenz Prefect Adrien de Lezay-Marnésia got Arnold a call to the University of Strasbourg. First Arnold got a chair for history, in 1811 he finally became professor for Roman law.

In 1818 Arnold made a trip to Great Britain. In 1820 he was elected to the office of a prefecture council and at the same time to the board of directors of the Church of Augsburg Confession of France.

In 1823 Arnold married the daughter of a landowner from Rappoltsweiler (Ribeauvillé) in Upper Alsace. He had a daughter with her.

On 18 February 1829, on his birthday, J.G.D. Arnold died of a stroke in Strasbourg.
