= Bené Arnold =

American ballerina and professor of ballet (1935–2024)

Bené Catheryn Moser Arnold (September 30, 1935 – January 25, 2024) was an American ballet dancer and a Distinguished Professor Emeritus at the University of Utah. She trained with the Ethel Meglin Dance Studio in Los Angeles and the San Francisco Ballet School, eventually becoming a soloist with the San Francisco Ballet Company. From 1963 to 1975, Arnold served as a ballet mistress for Ballet West in Salt Lake City, Utah. She later became a ballet instructor at the University of Utah.

Arnold died on January 25, 2024, at the age of 88.
