= Alice Arnold =

Alice Arnold may refer to

- Alice Arnold (broadcaster) (born 1962), British broadcaster and journalist
- Alice Arnold (mayor) (1881–1955), British socialist, the first female mayor of Coventry
- Alice Arnold Crawford (1850–1874), American poet
