= Edward Arnold =

Ed, Eddy, Eddie, Eduardo or Edward Arnold may refer to:

- Edward Vernon Arnold (1857–1926), British scholar of Sanscrit and Latin
- Edward Arnold (publisher) (1857–1942), English founder of Edward Arnold Publishers Ltd
- Edward Arnold (actor) (1890–1956), American star character performer
- Eddy Arnold (1918–2008), American star country singer
- Ed Arnold (born 1943), American state legislator from Pennsylvania
- Eduardo Arnold (born 1947), Argentine vice governor and legislator
- Eddie Arnold (1949–2001), English Olympic gymnast
