= F. T. Arnold =

Anglo-German musicologist and bibliophile

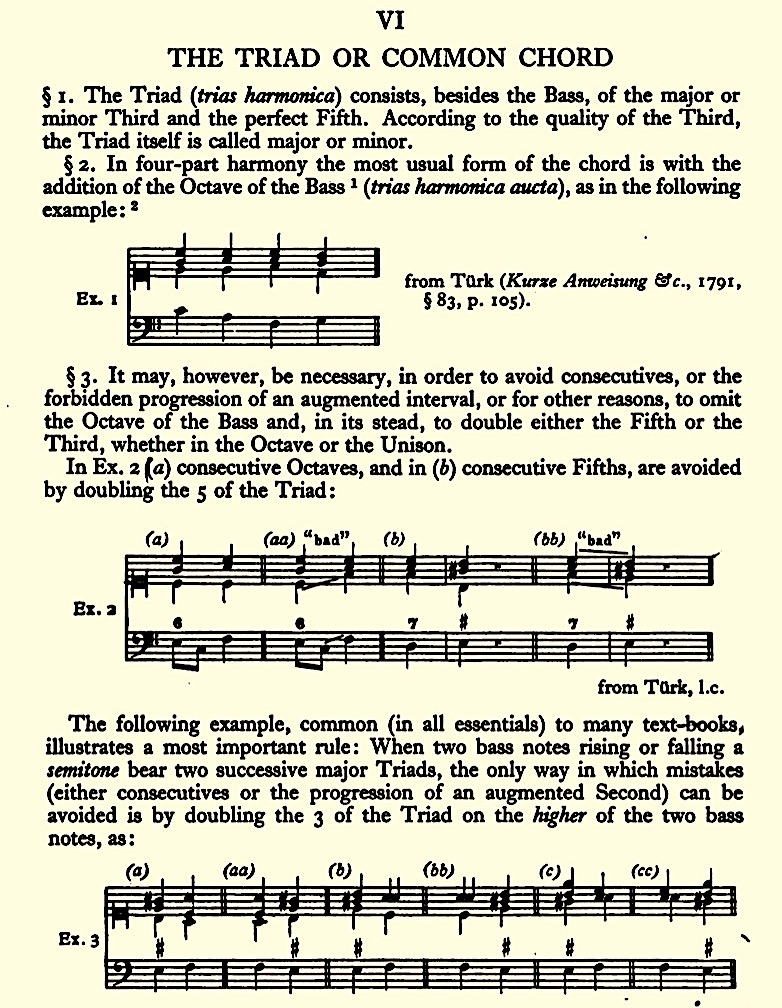
An extract from Arnold's Art of Accompaniment

Franck Thomas Arnold (1861-1940) was an Anglo-German musicologist and bibliophile. A self-taught scholar with a day job, he is best known for his The Art of Accompaniment from a Thorough-Bass (1931), described as the finest piece of musicography ever produced in England.

== Life ==
Arnold was born in Rugby, Warwickshire, on 6 September 1861, third son of the Rev. Charles Arnold, an assistant master at Rugby School, and Susanna Magdalena née Mays. The family was probably bilingual. His mother had been born in Heidelberg, where his father married her in separate Lutheran and Anglican ceremonies. Arnold seems to have been proud of his German roots. The Arnolds were a well-established family in Lowestoft with distinguished naval forebears; they were related to Dr Arnold of Rugby the famous headmaster.

After attending Rugby and Trinity College, Cambridge, in 1886 Arnold was appointed lecturer in German Language and Literature at the University College of South Wales and Monmouth – afterwards Cardiff University – a post he held for forty years. It allowed him enough spare time to devote to his musicological pursuits. He was a keen amateur cellist.

In 1887 he married Edith Maud Kelly. Their first son was given the somewhat Germanic names Karl Ferdinand Franck William. He became a captain in the British army and was killed at Zonnebeke near Ypres in 1915 after German forces enfiladed his trench.

Franck Arnold died in Bath on 24 September 1940.

== Work ==
=== The lost art of playing from figured bass ===
Composers of the Baroque era seldom wrote out musical accompaniments. Performers were expected to improvise (realize) these to suit the occasion, guided by no more than a bare sketch called a figured bass (or thorough-bass).

A figured bass was analogous to the lead sheets used by the rhythm sections in present-day bands, but realizing a figured bass was more demanding, because tight voice leading rules constrained what realizations were acceptable. Not only did the correct chords have to be played: the middle voices of those chords had to succeed each other faultlessly according to certain rules.

Despite those difficulties, competent musicians acquired the art of improvising an acceptable accompaniment from a figured bass, and doing so at sight. However, after the Baroque era the art was gradually forgotten. Arnold's aim was to recover it.

By teaching oneself this lost art, wrote Arnold, "an immense storehouse of music is opened which can be enjoyed in no other way". Further,

no one who has once tasted the delight of playing an ex tempore accompaniment from the figures, as the composer intended it to be played, could ever again become reconciled to dependence on the taste of [a modern] ‘arranger’.

Arnold had only wanted to teach himself how to accompany from old figured basses; he had no thought of writing a book. But the rules of Baroque harmony were quite strict, and when he tried to play he found he was running into many problems, technical and artistic, to which modern textbooks seemed to supply no answers.

=== Arnold's approach ===
There were thorough modern works by German authors, but these writers were scholarly historians with no particular interest in teaching modern performers how to play from a figured bass. In contrast, Arnold was a performer – talented perhaps, but amateur – who had the zeal to teach himself to be a scholar.

Arnold's approach was to recover the old learning, insofar as it was in writing and had survived, and to compile a synthesis of this knowledge illustrated by many practical examples. The task took him over 40 years.

Old treatises on figured bass realization existed, but they were exceedingly rare, and scattered about Europe. Arnold made it his purpose to hunt them down and acquire them. He also sought old musical scores if they threw some light on practical problems or the performing practices of a given era.

=== The Arnold Thorough-bass Collection ===
Over many years he amassed an important collection, which he afterward bequeathed to Cambridge University. Wrote Cambridge University music librarian Donald R. Wakeling, "Arnold in his search for a full knowledge of his subject was not content with drawing upon the resources of the libraries of Europe, but he also bought for himself all available literature and music from which he could absorb and note at leisure anything relating to thorough-bass".

Describing his collection in his book (1931) Arnold himself said:

The present treatise represents the labour of many years, and its compilation would have been impossible had not the writer been fortunate enough to acquire gradually all but a very few of the works (both didactic and musical) to which reference is made in its pages. He has pleasant memories of a little shop in St Martin's Lane, long since closed, where second-hand music was sold, among which treasures were sometimes to be found...

Like a true bibliophile,

Arnold not only spent freely in acquiring his books (and if a better copy of a work already in his possession was brought to his notice he often purchased it), but his loving care for his treasures prompted him to have them exquisitely bound, often in full leather with gilt tooling. The separate parts of the instrumental works are bound, some in handsome half-morocco cases, some individually; other works are brightly arrayed in roan, niger, morocco or vellum: he had an eye for colour.

=== The book ===
In 1931, despite the Depression and a thin subscription list, the Oxford University Press published his The Art of Accompaniment from a Thorough-Bass as Practised in the XVIIth and XVIIIth Centuries. Its first sentence reads:

The first object of the present work is to give adequate information concerning the way in which the accompaniment founded on a Basso continuo, or Thorough-Bass, was actually treated during the period, extending over wellnigh two centuries [i.e. the Baroque era], when such an accompaniment was, with few exceptions, a necessary part of every musical performance, solo or concerted, vocal or instrumental.

His 'adequate' information was exhaustive: the book's 918 pages cited the works of 110 Baroque practitioners, well known and obscure, with a wealth of practical examples.

=== Acclaim ===
William Gillies Whittaker the book's first reviewer described it as "an amazing product of prolonged investigation and accurate scholarship". To R.O. Morris (then professor of counterpoint at the Royal College of Music) it seemed "certain to stand for all human time as the standard work of reference". Sunday Times critic Ernest Newman said it was "the finest piece of musicography ever produced" in England. Other reviewers have described it as a "classic"; "this great work; the standard authority; "likely to remain the starting point for any serious study". Stanley Sadie said it was a "must have". One reviewer wrote: "This famous book does not need a review".

Although Arnold published other works – he wrote the article on Thorough-bass for Grove's Dictionary of Music and Musicians – his masterpiece was his book.

=== Further editions ===
A two-volume paperback edition was published by Dover Books (1965). A Kindle version is available.

== Sources ==
- Arnold, F. T. (1931). The Art of Accompaniment from a Thorough-Bass as Practised in the XVIIth and XVIIIth Centuries. London: Oxford University Press, Humphrey Milford.
- Arnold, F.T. (2013). The art of accompaniment from a thorough-bass. Vol. I (Kindle ed.). Dover.
- Beck, Joseph G. (1966). "Review: The Art of Accompaniment from a Thorough-Bass by F. T. Arnold and Denis Stevens". American Music Teacher. 16 (2): 38–39. JSTOR 43537083.
- Dolmetsch, Arnold (1915). The Interpretation of the Music of the XVIIth and XVIIIth Centuries Revealed by Contemporary Evidence. London: Novello.
- Donington, Robert (1982). Baroque Music: Style and Performance. A Handbook. New York: Norton. ISBN 0393300528.
- Emery, Walter (1961). "Review: Arnold's Thorough-Bass". The Musical Times. 102 (1422): 494. doi:10.2307/949984. JSTOR 949984.
- J.D. (1962). "Review: The Art of Accompaniment from a Thorough-Bass as Practised in the 17th and 18th Centuries by F. T. Arnold". Music & Letters. 43 (2). Oxford University Press: 164. JSTOR 732033.
- Ledbetter, David (1990). Continuo Playing According to Handel. His figured bass exercises. Oxford University Press. ISBN 978-0-19-318433-6.
- Leppard, Raymond (1993). Lewis, Thomas P. (ed.). Raymond Leppard on Music: An Anthology of Critical and Personal Writings. New York: Pro/Am. ISBN 0-912483-96-2.
- Morris, R. O. (1932). "Review: The Art of Accompaniment from a Thorough-Bass, as Practised in the XVIIth and XVIIIth Centuries by F. T. Arnold". Music & Letters. 13 (2). Oxford University Press: 230–233. doi:10.1093/ml/XIII.2.230. JSTOR 726760.
- Muskett, Joseph James (1894). Suffolk Manorial Families. Exeter: William Pollard & Co.
- Newman, Ernest (2 July 1944). "A Job for a Dictator?". Sunday Times.
- Principal Probate Registry (1915). Calendar of the Grants of Probate and Letters of Administration made in the Probate Registries of the High Court of Justice in England. London.
- Principal Probate Registry (1941). Calendar of the Grants of Probate and Letters of Administration made in the Probate Registries of the High Court of Justice in England. London.
- Ruvigny, Melville (1916). The roll of honour. A biographical record of all member's of His Majesty's naval and military forces who have fallen in the war. Vol. 1. London: Standard Art Book.
- Sadie, Stanley (1966). "Review: The Art of Accompaniment from a Thorough-Bass by F. T. Arnold; Thoroughbass Method by Hermann Keller". The Musical Times. 107 (1484): 872. doi:10.2307/953322. JSTOR 953322.
- Stipčević, Ennio (2009). "Review: The Performance of Italian Basso Continuo. Style in Keyboard Accompaniment in the Seventeenth and Eighteenth Centuries by Giulia NUTI". International Review of the Aesthetics and Sociology of Music. 40 (2). Croatian Musicological Society: 360–361. JSTOR 20696547.
- Venn, J. A (1940). Alumni Cantabrigienses: Part II. Vol. 1. London: Cambridge University Press.
- Wakeling, Donald E. (1945). "An Interesting Music Collection". Music & Letters. 26 (3). Oxford University Press: 159–161. doi:10.1093/ml/XXVI.3.159. JSTOR 727649.
- Whittaker, W. Gillies (1932). "The Art of Accompaniment from a Thorough-Bass". The Musical Times. 73 (1067): 32–34. doi:10.2307/915170. JSTOR 915170..
