= List of Jamestown Jimmies head football coaches =

The Jamestown Jimmies program is a college football team that represents the University of Jamestown in the Northern Sun Intercollegiate Conference, a part of the NCAA. The team has had 16 head coaches since its first recorded football game in 1914. The current coach is Brian Mistro who was hired in January 2019.

== Key ==
Key to symbols in coaches list
General		Overall		Conference		Postseason (Note: Although the first Rose Bowl Game was played in 1902, it has been continuously played since the 1916 game, and is recognized as the oldest bowl game by the NCAA. "—" indicates any season prior to 1916 when postseason games were not played.)	
No.	Order of coaches (Note: A running total of the number of head coaches, with coaches who served separate tenures being counted only once. Interim head coaches are represented with "Int" and are not counted in the running total. "—" indicates the team played but either without a coach or no coach is on record. "X" indicates an interim year without play.)	GC	Games coached	CW	Conference wins	PW	Postseason wins
DC	Division championships	OW	Overall wins	CL	Conference losses	PL	Postseason losses
CC	Conference championships	OL	Overall losses	CT	Conference ties	PT	Postseason ties
NC	National championships	OT	Overall ties (Note: Overtime rules in college football were introduced in 1996, making ties impossible in the period since.)	C%	Conference winning percentage		
†	Elected to the College Football Hall of Fame	O%	Overall winning percentage (Note: When computing the win–loss percentage, a tie counts as half a win and half a loss.)				

== Coaches ==
No.	Name	Term	GC	OW	OL	OT	O%	CW	CL	CT	C%	PW	PL	CCs	Awards
1	R. G. "Stanley" Dougan	1914–1915	13	6	5	2	.538	—	—	—	—	—	—	—	—
2	R. R. Dougherty	1916–1917	10	9	1	0	.900	—	—	—	—	—	—	—	—
X	No Team	1918	—	—	—	—	—	—	—	—	—	—	—	—	—
3	L. W. Upshaw	1919–1920	3	1	1	1	.500	—	—	—	—	—	—	—	—
4	Floyd B. Barnum	1921	3	0	2	1	.167	—	—	—	—	—	—	—	—
5	Karl L. Ericson	1922–1929	55	23	28	4	.455	—	—	—	—	—	—	—	—
6	Elvin J. Cassell	1930–1942; 1945–1946; 1951–1953	126	64	49	13	.560	—	—	—	—	—	—	—	—
X	No Team	1943–1944	—	—	—	—	—	—	—	—	—	—	—	—	—
7	Carl Arnold	1947–1948	15	1	13	1	.100	—	—	—	—	—	—	—	—
8	William "Bill" Ordway	1949–1950	16	5	11	0	.313	—	—	—	—	—	—	—	—
9	Stanley "Stan" Marshall	1954–1956	16	12	3	1	.781	—	—	—	—	—	—	—	—
10	Sidney "Sid" Grande	1957–1963	48	22	25	1	.469	—	—	—	—	—	—	—	—
11	Jim McCord	1964	3	0	3	0	.000	—	—	—	—	—	—	—	—
12	Rollie Greeno	1965–1991	239	154	83	2	.649	—	—	—	—	—	—	—	—
13	Joel Swisher	1992–1994	27	15	12	0	.556	—	—	—	—	—	—	—	—
14	Emmett "Bud" Etzold	1995–1999; 2008–2011	68	35	33	0	.515	—	—	—	—	—	—	—	—
15	Curt Skotnicki	2000–2003	40	17	23	0	.425	—	—	—	—	—	—	—	—
16	Tom Dosch	2004–2007	42	25	17	0	.595	—	—	—	—	—	—	—	—
17	Shawn Frank	2012–2015	36	13	23	0	.361	—	—	—	—	—	—	—	—
Int	Travis Titus	2015	4	3	1	0	.750	—	—	—	—	—	—	—	—
18	Josh Kittell	2016–2018	33	3	30	0	.091	—	—	—	—	—	—	—	—
19	Brian Mistro	2019–	72	15	57	0	.208	—	—	—	—	—	—	—	—
