= Carl Arnold =

Carl Arnold may refer to:

- Carl Arnold (American football), American football player
- Carl Arnold (composer) (1794–1873), German pianist and composer

== See also ==
- Karl Arnold (disambiguation)
