= Carl Erickson =

Carl Erickson may refer to:

- Bud Ericksen (1916–2008), Carleton Lyons "Bud" Ericksen, American football offensive lineman
- Carl Erickson (illustrator) (1891–1958), American fashion illustrator and advertising artist
- Carl Erickson (screenwriter) (1908–1935), American screenwriter

== See also ==
- Carl Ericson (born 1996), Swedish ice hockey player
- Karl L. Ericson (1895–1965), American football and basketball coach
