= Skotnicki =

Skotnicki is a surname. Notable people with the surname include:

- Aleksander Skotnicki (hematologist) (born 1948), Polish hematologist and transplantologist
- Curt Skotnicki, American football coach
- Stanisław Grzmot-Skotnicki (1894–1939), Polish military commander
