= March 17 =

March 17 this year in various calendars
- Tuesday, 17 March 2026
Akan	Monobene
Armenian	30 Areg 1475
Aztec	Huei Tecuilhuitl 6, 2 Ocēlōtl
Babylonian	27 Shabatu, 2336 SE
Balinese pawukon	Menga, Kajeng, Laba, Pon, Maulu, Anggara of Kelawu, Brahma, Dadi, Pandita
Bengali	3 Chaitro, BS 1432
Chinese	Yang Metal Tiger・Encampment Mansion; Fire Horse Year, Month 1, Day 29 (Jingzhe, 3 days until Chunfen)
Common Era	17 March 2026 CE
Coptic	8 Paremhat, AM 1742
Egyptian	5 Mesori, 2774 NE
Ethiopian	8 Magābit, 2018 Amätä Məhrät
French Republican	Décade III, Septidi de Ventôse de l'Année 234 de la République
Gregorian	17 March, AD 2026
Hebrew	28 Adar, AM 5786
Hindu	Śatabhiṣaj・Siddha; Solar: 4 Caitra, 1947 SE; Lunisolar: Trayodaśī, Kṛishna pakṣa of Phālguna, 2082 VE; Rāudra・5126 KY・1,872,651
Icelandic	Þriðjudagur, 24 Góa 2025
Islamic	28 Ramadan, AH 1447 (using tabular method)
ISO week date	2026-W12-2
Japanese	29 Mutsuki, Reiwa 8 (Keichitsu, 3 days until Shunbun)
Julian	4 March, AD 2026 (AM 7534)
Julian day	2461117
Korean	29 Horangidal, 4359 DE
Maya	13.0.13.7.14; 12 Cumku, 2 Ix
Roman	ante diem IV Nonas Martias, MMDCCLXXIX AUC
Solar Hijri	26 Esfand, SH 1404
Tibetan	29 mchu, me pho rta 2153 or 1772 or 1000

<<	March					>>
Su	Mo	Tu	We	Th	Fr	Sa
1	2	3	4	5	6	7
8	9	10	11	12	13	14
15	16	17	18	19	20	21
22	23	24	25	26	27	28
29	30	31
2026

March 17 in recent years
2026 (Tuesday)
2025 (Monday)
2024 (Sunday)
2023 (Friday)
2022 (Thursday)
2021 (Wednesday)
2020 (Tuesday)
2019 (Sunday)
2018 (Saturday)
2017 (Friday)

March 17 is the 76th day of the year (77th in leap years) in the Gregorian calendar; 289 days remain until the end of the year.

== Events ==
=== Pre-1600 ===
- 45 BC – In his last victory, Julius Caesar defeats the Pompeian forces of Titus Labienus and Pompey the Younger in the Battle of Munda.
- 180 – Commodus becomes sole emperor of the Roman Empire at the age of eighteen, following the death of his father, Marcus Aurelius.
- 455 – Petronius Maximus becomes, with support of the Roman Senate, emperor of the Western Roman Empire; he forces Licinia Eudoxia, the widow of his predecessor, Valentinian III, to marry him.
- 1337 – Edward the Black Prince is made Duke of Cornwall, the first duchy in England.
- 1400 – Turko-Mongol emperor Timur sacks Damascus.

=== 1601–1900 ===
- 1776 – American Revolutionary War: The British Army evacuates Boston, ending the Siege of Boston, after George Washington and Henry Knox place artillery in positions overlooking the city.
- 1805 – The Italian Republic, with Napoleon as president, becomes the Kingdom of Italy, with Napoleon as King of Italy.
- 1824 – The Anglo-Dutch Treaty is signed in London, dividing the Malay archipelago. As a result, the Malay Peninsula is dominated by the British, while Sumatra and Java and surrounding areas are dominated by the Dutch.
- 1842 – The Female Relief Society of Nauvoo is formally organized with Emma Smith as president.
- 1860 – The First Taranaki War begins in Taranaki, New Zealand, a major phase of the New Zealand Wars.
- 1861 – The Kingdom of Italy is proclaimed.
- 1862 – The first railway line of Finland between cities of Helsinki and Hämeenlinna, called Päärata, is officially opened.
- 1891 – SS Utopia collides with HMS Anson in the Bay of Gibraltar and sinks, killing 562 of the 880 passengers on board.

=== 1901–present ===
- 1921 – The Second Polish Republic adopts the March Constitution.
- 1942 – Holocaust: The first Jews from the Lvov Ghetto are gassed at the Belzec death camp in what is today eastern Poland.
- 1945 – World War II: The Ludendorff Bridge in Remagen, Germany, collapses, ten days after its capture.
- 1948 – Belgium, France, Luxembourg, the Netherlands and the United Kingdom sign the Treaty of Brussels, a precursor to the North Atlantic Treaty establishing NATO.
- 1950 – Researchers at the University of California, Berkeley announce the creation of element 98, which they name "californium".
- 1957 – A plane crash in Cebu, Philippines kills Philippine President Ramon Magsaysay and 24 others.
- 1958 – The United States launches the first solar-powered satellite, which is also the first satellite to achieve a long-term orbit.
- 1960 – U.S. President Dwight D. Eisenhower signs the National Security Council directive on the anti-Cuban covert action program that will ultimately lead to the Bay of Pigs Invasion.
- 1960 – Northwest Airlines Flight 710 explodes and crashes near Cannelton, Indiana, killing 63.
- 1962 – A Clockwork Orange, a British dystopian novel by Anthony Burgess, is published.
- 1963 – Mount Agung erupts on Bali killing more than 1,100 people.
- 1966 – Off the coast of Spain in the Mediterranean, the DSV Alvin submarine finds a missing American hydrogen bomb.
- 1968 – As a result of nerve gas testing by the U.S. Army Chemical Corps in Skull Valley, Utah, over 6,000 sheep are found dead.
- 1969 – Golda Meir becomes the first female Prime Minister of Israel.
- 1973 – The Pulitzer Prize–winning photograph Burst of Joy is taken, depicting a former prisoner of war being reunited with his family, which came to symbolize the end of United States involvement in the Vietnam War.
- 1979 – The Penmanshiel Tunnel collapses during engineering works, killing two workers.
- 1979 – Aeroflot Flight 1691 crashes on approach to Vnukovo International Airport, killing 58.
- 1985 – Serial killer Richard Ramirez, aka the "Night Stalker", commits the first two murders in his Los Angeles murder spree.
- 1988 – A Colombian Boeing 727 jetliner, Avianca Flight 410, crashes into a mountainside near the Venezuelan border killing 143.
- 1988 – Eritrean War of Independence: The Nadew Command, an Ethiopian army corps in Eritrea, is attacked on three sides by military units of the Eritrean People's Liberation Front in the opening action of the Battle of Afabet.
- 1992 – Israeli Embassy attack in Buenos Aires: Car bomb attack kills 29 and injures 242.
- 1992 – A referendum to end apartheid in South Africa is passed 68.7% to 31.2%.
- 2000 – Five hundred and thirty members of the Ugandan cult Movement for the Restoration of the Ten Commandments of God die in a fire, considered to be a mass murder or suicide orchestrated by leaders of the cult. Elsewhere another 248 members are later found dead.
- 2003 – Leader of the House of Commons and Lord President of the Council, Robin Cook, resigns from the British Cabinet in disagreement with government plans for the 2003 invasion of Iraq.
- 2004 – Unrest in Kosovo: More than 22 are killed and 200 wounded. Thirty-five Serbian Orthodox shrines in Kosovo and two mosques in Serbia are destroyed.
- 2016 – Rojava conflict: At a conference in Rmelan, the Movement for a Democratic Society declares the establishment of the Democratic Federation of Northern Syria.

== Births ==
=== Pre-1600 ===
- 763 – Harun al-Rashid, Abbasid caliph (died 809)
- 1231 – Emperor Shijō of Japan (died 1242)
- 1473 – James IV of Scotland (died 1513)
- 1523 – Giovanni Francesco Commendone, Catholic cardinal (died 1584)
- 1537 – Toyotomi Hideyoshi, Japanese daimyō (died 1598)

=== 1601–1900 ===
- 1611 – Robert Douglas, Count of Skenninge, Swedish field marshal (died 1662)
- 1665 – Élisabeth Jacquet de La Guerre, French harpsichord player and composer (died 1729)
- 1676 – Thomas Boston, Scottish philosopher and theologian (died 1732)
- 1686 – Jean-Baptiste Oudry, French painter and engraver (died 1755)
- 1725 – Lachlan McIntosh, Scottish-American general and politician (died 1806)
- 1777 – Patrick Brontë, Irish-English priest and author (died 1861)
- 1777 – Roger B. Taney, American politician and jurist, 5th Chief Justice of the United States (died 1864)
- 1780 – Thomas Chalmers, Scottish minister, economist, and educator (died 1847)
- 1781 – Ebenezer Elliott, English poet and educator (died 1849)
- 1804 – Jim Bridger, American fur trader and explorer (died 1881)
- 1806 – Norbert Rillieux, African American inventor and chemical engineer (died 1894)
- 1820 – Jean Ingelow, English poet and author (died 1897)
- 1832 – Joseph Skipsey, English miner, author and poet (died 1903)
- 1834 – Gottlieb Daimler, German engineer and businessman, co-founded Daimler-Motoren-Gesellschaft (died 1900)
- 1839 – Josef Rheinberger, Liechtensteiner-German organist and composer (died 1901)
- 1842 – Rosina Heikel, Finnish physician (died 1929)
- 1846 – Kate Greenaway, English author and illustrator (died 1901)
- 1848 – Ernesta Forti, Italian anarchist and dairy worker
- 1849 – Charles F. Brush, American businessman and philanthropist, co-invented the Arc lamp (died 1929)
- 1849 – Cornelia Clapp, American marine biologist (died 1934)
- 1856 – Mikhail Vrubel, Russian painter (died 1910)
- 1862 – Martha P. Falconer, American social reformer (died 1941)
- 1862 – Silvio Gesell, Belgian merchant and economist (died 1930)
- 1864 – Joseph Baptista, Indian engineer, lawyer, and politician (died 1930)
- 1866 – Pierce Butler, American lawyer and jurist (died 1939)
- 1867 – Patrice Contamine de Latour, Spanish poet (died 1926)
- 1877 – Edith New, English militant suffragette (died 1951)
- 1877 – Otto Gross, Austrian-German psychoanalyst and philosopher (died 1920)
- 1877 – Ville Kiviniemi, Finnish politician (died 1951)
- 1880 – Patrick Hastings, English lawyer and politician, Attorney General for England and Wales (died 1952)
- 1880 – Lawrence Oates, English lieutenant and explorer (died 1912)
- 1881 – Walter Rudolf Hess, Swiss physiologist and academic, Nobel Prize laureate (died 1973)
- 1884 – Alcide Nunez, American clarinet player (died 1934)
- 1885 – Ralph Rose, American track and field athlete (died 1913)
- 1886 – Princess Patricia of Connaught (died 1974)
- 1888 – Paul Ramadier, French lawyer and politician, Prime Minister of France (died 1961)
- 1889 – Harry Clarke, Irish stained-glass artist and book illustrator (died 1931)
- 1891 – Ross McLarty, Australian politician, 17th Premier of Western Australia (died 1962)
- 1892 – Floyd B. Barnum, American college football coach (died 1965)
- 1892 – Sayed Darwish, Egyptian singer-songwriter and producer (died 1923)
- 1894 – Paul Green, American playwright and academic (died 1981)
- 1895 – Lloyd Rees, Australian painter (died 1988)
- 1900 – Alfred Newman, American composer and conductor (died 1970)

=== 1901–present ===
- 1902 – Bobby Jones, American golfer and lawyer (died 1971)
- 1903 – Elli Stenberg, Finnish politician (died 1987)
- 1904 – Chaim Gross, Austrian-American sculptor and educator (died 1991)
- 1905 – Lillian Yarbo, American comedienne, dancer, and singer (died 1996)
- 1907 – Takeo Miki, Japanese politician, 41st Prime Minister of Japan (died 1988)
- 1907 – Jean Van Houtte, Belgian academic and politician, 50th Prime Minister of Belgium (died 1991)
- 1908 – Brigitte Helm, German-Swiss actress (died 1996)
- 1910 – Sonny Werblin, American businessman and philanthropist (died 1991)
- 1912 – Bayard Rustin, American activist (died 1987)
- 1914 – Sammy Baugh, American football player and coach (died 2008)
- 1915 – Robert S. Arbib Jr., American ornithologist, writer and conservationist (died 1987)
- 1915 – Bill Roycroft, Australian equestrian rider (died 2011)
- 1916 – Ray Ellington, English drummer and bandleader (died 1985)
- 1917 – Hank Sauer, American baseball player (died 2001)
- 1919 – Nat King Cole, American singer, pianist, and television host (died 1965)
- 1919 – Mad Mike Hoare, British-Irish military officer and mercenary (died 2020)
- 1920 – Sheikh Mujibur Rahman, Bangladeshi politician, 1st President of Bangladesh (died 1975)
- 1921 – Meir Amit, Israeli general and politician, 12th Israeli Minister of Communications (died 2009)
- 1922 – Patrick Suppes, American psychologist and philosopher (died 2014)
- 1924 – Stephen Dodgson, English composer and educator (died 2013)
- 1925 – Gabriele Ferzetti, Italian actor (died 2015)
- 1926 – Siegfried Lenz, Polish-German author and playwright (died 2014)
- 1927 – Betty Allen, American soprano and educator (died 2009)
- 1928 – William John McKeag, Canadian businessman and politician, 17th Lieutenant Governor of Manitoba (died 2007)
- 1930 – Paul Horn, American-Canadian flute player and saxophonist (died 2014)
- 1930 – James Irwin, American colonel, pilot, and astronaut, eighth astronaut to walk on the moon (died 1991)
- 1931 – Patricia Breslin, American actress (died 2011)
- 1931 – David Peakall, English-American chemist and toxicologist (died 2001)
- 1932 – Dick Curless, American country music singer (died 1995)
- 1933 – Myrlie Evers-Williams, American journalist and activist
- 1933 – Penelope Lively, English author
- 1935 – Fred T. Mackenzie, American biologist and academic (died 2024)
- 1935 – Adam Wade, American singer, drummer, and actor (died 2022)
- 1936 – Ida Kleijnen, Dutch chef (died 2019)
- 1936 – Ladislav Kupkovič, Slovak composer and conductor (died 2016)
- 1936 – Ken Mattingly, American admiral, pilot, and astronaut (died 2023)
- 1937 – Galina Samsova, Russian ballerina (died 2021)
- 1938 – Rudolf Nureyev, Russian-French dancer and choreographer (died 1993)
- 1938 – Keith O'Brien, Northern Ireland-born Scottish cleric, theologian, and cardinal (died 2018)
- 1938 – Zola Taylor, American singer (died 2007)
- 1939 – Jim Gary, American sculptor (died 2006)
- 1939 – Bill Graham, Canadian academic and politician, 4th Canadian Minister of Foreign Affairs (died 2022)
- 1939 – Robin Knox-Johnston, English sailor and first person to perform a single-handed non-stop circumnavigation of the globe
- 1939 – Giovanni Trapattoni, Italian footballer and manager
- 1940 – Mark White, American lawyer and politician, 43rd Governor of Texas (died 2017)
- 1941 – Wang Jin-pyng, Taiwanese soldier and politician
- 1941 – Paul Kantner, American singer-songwriter and guitarist (died 2016)
- 1941 – Max Stafford-Clark, English director and academic
- 1942 – John Wayne Gacy, American serial killer and rapist (died 1994)
- 1942 – Yoko Yamamoto, Japanese actress (died 2024)
- 1943 – Jeff Banks, Welsh fashion designer
- 1943 – Andrew Brook, Canadian philosopher, author, and academic
- 1944 – Pattie Boyd, English model, author, and photographer
- 1944 – Cito Gaston, American baseball player and manager
- 1945 – Michael Hayden, American general, 20th Director of the Central Intelligence Agency
- 1947 – Dennis Bond, English footballer (died 2025)
- 1947 – Yury Chernavsky, Russian-American songwriter and producer (died 2025)
- 1948 – William Gibson, American-Canadian author and screenwriter
- 1948 – Alex MacDonald, Scottish footballer and manager
- 1949 – Pat Rice, Irish footballer and coach
- 1949 – Stuart Rose, English businessman
- 1951 – Scott Gorham, American singer-songwriter and guitarist
- 1951 – Craig Ramsay, Canadian ice hockey player and coach
- 1952 – Barry Horne, English activist (died 2001)
- 1953 – Filemon Lagman, Filipino activist (died 2001)
- 1953 – Chuck Muncie, American football player (died 2013)
- 1955 – Cynthia McKinney, American activist and politician
- 1956 – Patrick McDonnell, American author and illustrator
- 1956 – Rory McGrath, British comedian, television personality, and writer
- 1957 – Michael Kelly, American journalist and author (died 2003)
- 1959 – Danny Ainge, American baseball and basketball player
- 1959 – Paul Black, American singer-songwriter and drummer
- 1961 – Sam Bowie, American basketball player
- 1961 – Dana Reeve, American actress, singer, and activist (died 2006)
- 1962 – Carsten Almqvist, Swedish business executive
- 1962 – Ank Bijleveld, Dutch politician
- 1962 – Janet Gardner, American singer and guitarist
- 1962 – Clare Grogan, Scottish singer and actress
- 1962 – Rob Sitch, Australian actor, director, and producer
- 1963 – Roger Harper, Guyanese cricketer and coach
- 1964 – Stefano Borgonovo, Italian footballer (died 2013)
- 1964 – Lee Dixon, English footballer and journalist
- 1964 – Rob Lowe, American actor
- 1964 – Jacques Songo'o, Cameroonian footballer and coach
- 1965 – Andrew Hudson, South African cricketer
- 1966 – Andrew Rosindell, English journalist and politician
- 1967 – Barry Minkow, American pastor and businessman
- 1968 – Eri Nitta, Japanese singer-songwriter and actress
- 1969 – Edgar Grospiron, French skier
- 1969 – Alexander McQueen, English fashion designer, founded eponymous brand (died 2010)
- 1970 – Patrick Lebeau, Canadian ice hockey player
- 1970 – Gene Ween, American singer-songwriter and guitarist
- 1971 – Bill Mueller, American baseball player and coach
- 1972 – Torquil Campbell, English-Canadian singer-songwriter and actor
- 1973 – Rico Blanco, Filipino singer-songwriter, guitarist, producer, and actor
- 1973 – Vance Wilson, American baseball player and manager
- 1974 – Mark Dolan, English comedian and television host
- 1975 – Justin Hawkins, English singer-songwriter
- 1975 – Puneeth Rajkumar, Indian actor, singer, and producer (died 2021)
- 1975 – Test, Canadian-American wrestler (died 2009)
- 1976 – Scott Downs, American baseball player
- 1976 – Stephen Gately, Irish singer-songwriter and actor (died 2009)
- 1976 – Álvaro Recoba, Uruguayan footballer
- 1977 – Tamar Braxton, American singer and television personality
- 1978 – Zachery Kouwe, American journalist
- 1979 – Stormy Daniels, American adult film actress
- 1979 – Andrew Ference, Canadian ice hockey player
- 1979 – Stephen Kramer Glickman, Canadian-American actor, director, producer, and fashion designer
- 1979 – Mineko Nomachi, Japanese essayist
- 1979 – Samoa Joe, American professional wrestler
- 1980 – Danny Califf, American soccer player
- 1981 – Aaron Baddeley, American-Australian golfer
- 1981 – Servet Çetin, Turkish footballer
- 1981 – Nicky Jam, Puerto Rican singer-songwriter
- 1981 – Kyle Korver, American basketball player
- 1982 – Steven Pienaar, South African footballer
- 1983 – James Heath, English golfer
- 1983 – Raul Meireles, Portuguese footballer
- 1983 – Attila Vajda, Hungarian sprint canoeist
- 1984 – Chris Copeland, American basketball player and coach
- 1984 – Ryan Rottman, American actor, producer, and screenwriter
- 1985 – Tuğba Karademir, Turkish-Canadian figure skater
- 1985 – César Valdez, Dominican baseball player
- 1986 – Chris Davis, American baseball player
- 1986 – Edin Džeko, Bosnian footballer
- 1986 – Miles Kane, English singer-songwriter and guitarist
- 1986 – Jeremy Pargo, American basketball player
- 1986 – Silke Spiegelburg, German pole vaulter
- 1987 – Federico Fazio, Argentine footballer
- 1987 – Rob Kardashian, American television personality
- 1987 – Carlos Lampe, Bolivian footballer
- 1987 – Ryan Parent, Canadian ice hockey player
- 1987 – Bobby Ryan, American ice hockey player
- 1987 – Emmanuel Sanders, American football player
- 1988 – Rasmus Elm, Swedish footballer
- 1988 – Fraser Forster, English footballer
- 1988 – Grimes, Canadian musician, singer-songwriter, producer, and visual artist
- 1988 – Brent Meuleman, Belgian politician
- 1988 – Ryan White, Canadian ice hockey player
- 1989 – Mikael Backlund, Swedish ice hockey player
- 1989 – Shinji Kagawa, Japanese footballer
- 1989 – Juan Lagares, Dominican baseball player
- 1989 – Harry Melling, English actor
- 1990 – Hozier, Irish musician
- 1990 – Saina Nehwal, Indian badminton player
- 1990 – Jean Segura, Dominican baseball player
- 1991 – Sergey Kalinin, Russian ice hockey player
- 1991 – Cordarrelle Patterson, American football player
- 1991 – Thomas Robinson, American-Lebanese basketball player
- 1992 – John Boyega, British actor and producer
- 1992 – Patrick Cantlay, American golfer
- 1992 – Yeltsin Tejeda, Costa Rican footballer
- 1993 – Matteo Bianchetti, Italian footballer
- 1993 – Rhys Hoskins, American baseball player
- 1993 – Yao Yuanjun, Chinese Border police officer (died 2011)
- 1994 – DeForest Buckner, American football player
- 1994 – Terry Rozier, American basketball player
- 1994 – Ivan Provedel, Italian footballer
- 1994 – Marcel Sabitzer, Austrian footballer
- 1995 – Claressa Shields, American boxer and mixed martial artist
- 1997 – Katie Ledecky, American swimmer
- 1997 – Daniel Sprong, Dutch ice hockey player
- 1998 – Brandon Aiyuk, American football player
- 2001 – Pietro Pellegri, Italian footballer

== Deaths ==
=== Pre-1600 ===
- 45 BC – Titus Labienus, Roman general (born 100 BC)
- 45 BC – Publius Attius Varus, Roman governor of Africa
- 180 – Marcus Aurelius, Roman emperor (born 121)
- 659 – Gertrude of Nivelles, Frankish abbess
- 836 – Haito, bishop of Basel
- 905 – Li Yu, Prince of De, prince and emperor of the Tang Dynasty
- 1008 – Kazan, emperor of Japan (born 968)
- 1040 – Harold Harefoot, king of England
- 1058 – Lulach, king of Scotland
- 1199 – Jocelin of Glasgow, Scottish monk and bishop (born 1130)
- 1267 – Pierre de Montreuil, French architect
- 1270 – Philip of Montfort, French knight and nobleman
- 1272 – Go-Saga, emperor of Japan (born 1220)
- 1361 – An-Nasir Hasan, Mamluk sultan of Egypt
- 1394 – Louis of Enghien, French nobleman
- 1406 – Ibn Khaldun, Tunisian sociologist, historian, and scholar (born 1332)
- 1425 – Ashikaga Yoshikazu, Japanese shōgun (born 1407)
- 1516 – Giuliano de' Medici, Italian nobleman (born 1479)
- 1527 – Rana Sanga, Indian ruler (born 1482)
- 1565 – Alexander Ales, Scottish theologian and academic (born 1500)

=== 1601–1900 ===
- 1611 – Sophia of Sweden, duchess of Saxe-Lauenburg (born 1547)
- 1620 – John Sarkander, Polish-Moravian priest and saint (born 1576)
- 1640 – Philip Massinger, English playwright (born 1583)
- 1649 – Gabriel Lalemant, French missionary and saint (born 1610)
- 1663 – Jerome Weston, 2nd Earl of Portland, English diplomat (born 1605)
- 1680 – François de La Rochefoucauld, French author (born 1613)
- 1704 – Menno van Coehoorn, Dutch soldier and engineer (born 1641)
- 1715 – Gilbert Burnet, Scottish bishop and historian (born 1643)
- 1741 – Jean-Baptiste Rousseau, French poet and playwright (born 1671)
- 1764 – George Parker, 2nd Earl of Macclesfield, English astronomer and politician (born 1695)
- 1782 – Daniel Bernoulli, Dutch-Swiss mathematician and physicist (born 1700)
- 1828 – James Edward Smith, English botanist and entomologist (born 1759)
- 1829 – Sophia Albertina, princess-abbess of Quedlinburg (born 1753)
- 1830 – Laurent de Gouvion Saint-Cyr, French general and politician (born 1764)
- 1846 – Friedrich Bessel, German astronomer, mathematician, and physicist (born 1784)
- 1849 – William II, Dutch sovereign prince and king (born 1792)
- 1853 – Christian Doppler, Austrian physicist and mathematician (born 1803)
- 1871 – Robert Chambers, Scottish geologist and publisher, co-founded Chambers Harrap (born 1802)
- 1875 – Ferdinand Laub, Czech violinist and composer (born 1832)
- 1893 – Jules Ferry, French lawyer and politician, 44th Prime Minister of France (born 1832)

=== 1901–present ===
- 1902 – John Houlding, English businessman, founded Liverpool Football Club (born 1833)
- 1917
  - Franz Brentano, German philosopher and psychologist (born 1838)
  - Fredericus van Rossum du Chattel, Dutch painter (born 1856)
- 1926 – Aleksei Brusilov, Georgian-Russian general (born 1853)
- 1934 – Bede Jarrett, English Dominican priest (born 1881)
- 1940 – Philomène Belliveau, Canadian artist (born 1854)
- 1942 – Nada Dimić, People's Hero of Yugoslavia, victim of Genocide of Serbs (born 1923)
- 1946 – Dai Li, Chinese general (born 1897)
- 1947 – Mike, American Wyandotte chicken, lived 18 months following decapitation (h. 1945)
- 1949 – Aleksandra Ekster, Russian-French painter and set designer (born 1882)
- 1956 – Fred Allen, American actor, comedian, screenwriter, and author (born 1894)
- 1956 – Irène Joliot-Curie, French physicist and chemist, Nobel Prize laureate (born 1897)
- 1957 – Ramon Magsaysay, Filipino captain and politician, 7th President of the Philippines (born 1907)
- 1958 – John Pius Boland, Irish tennis player and politician (born 1870)
- 1958 – Bertha De Vriese, Belgian physician (born 1877)
- 1961 – Susanna M. Salter, American activist and politician (born 1860)
- 1965 – Amos Alonzo Stagg, American football player and coach (born 1862)
- 1974 – Louis Kahn, American architect and academic, designed Jatiyo Sangsad Bhaban (born 1901)
- 1976 – Luchino Visconti, Italian director and screenwriter (born 1906)
- 1981 – Paul Dean, American baseball player (born 1913)
- 1983 – Haldan Keffer Hartline, American physiologist and academic, Nobel Prize laureate (born 1903)
- 1983 – Louisa E. Rhine, American botanist and parapsychologist (born 1891)
- 1986 – Clarence D. Lester, African-American fighter pilot (born 1923)
- 1990 – Capucine, French model and actress (born 1928)
- 1990 – Dinkar G. Kelkar, Indian art collector (born 1896)
- 1992 – Grace Stafford, American actress (born 1903)
- 1993 – Helen Hayes, American actress (born 1900)
- 1994 – Charlotte Auerbach, German-Jewish Scottish folklorist, geneticist, and zoologist (born 1899)
- 1994 – Mai Zetterling, Swedish-English actress and director (born 1925)
- 1995 – Sunnyland Slim, American blues pianist (born 1906)
- 1996 – René Clément, French director and screenwriter (born 1913)
- 1996 – Terry Stafford, American singer-songwriter (born 1941)
- 1997 – Jermaine Stewart, American singer-songwriter and dancer (born 1957)
- 1999 – Ernest Gold, Austrian-American composer (born 1921)
- 1999 – Jean Pierre-Bloch, French activist (born 1905)
- 2001 – Anthony Storr, English psychiatrist, psychoanalyst, and author (born 1920)
- 2002 – Rosetta LeNoire, American actress and producer (born 1911)
- 2002 – Văn Tiến Dũng, Vietnamese general and politician, 6th Minister of Defence for Vietnam (born 1917)
- 2002 – Sylvester "Pat" Weaver, American television broadcaster and producer (born 1908)
- 2005 – Royce Frith, Canadian lawyer, politician, and diplomat, Canadian High Commissioner to the United Kingdom (born 1923)
- 2005 – George F. Kennan, American historian and diplomat, United States Ambassador to the Soviet Union (born 1904)
- 2005 – Andre Norton, American author (born 1912)
- 2006 – Oleg Cassini, French-American fashion designer (born 1913)
- 2006 – Ray Meyer, American basketball player and coach (born 1913)
- 2006 – İstemihan Taviloğlu, Turkish composer and educator (born 1945)
- 2007 – John Backus, American mathematician and computer scientist, designed Fortran (born 1924)
- 2008 – Roland Arnall, French-American businessman and diplomat, 63rd United States Ambassador to the Netherlands (born 1939)
- 2009 – Clodovil Hernandes, Brazilian television host and politician (born 1937)
- 2010 – Alex Chilton, American singer-songwriter, guitarist, and producer (born 1950)
- 2010 – Sid Fleischman, American author and screenwriter (born 1920)
- 2011 – Michael Gough, English actor (born 1916)
- 2011 – Ferlin Husky, American country music singer (born 1925)
- 2012 – Shenouda III, pope of Alexandria (born 1923)
- 2012 – Margaret Whitlam, Australian swimmer and author (born 1919)
- 2013 – William B. Caldwell III, American general (born 1925)
- 2013 – Lawrence Fuchs, American scholar and academic (born 1927)
- 2013 – A.B.C. Whipple, American journalist and historian (born 1918)
- 2014 – Marek Galiński, Polish cyclist (born 1974)
- 2014 – Joseph Kerman, American musicologist and critic (born 1924)
- 2014 – Rachel Lambert Mellon, American gardener, philanthropist, art collector and political patron (born 1910)
- 2015 – Frank Perris, Canadian motorcycle racer (born 1931)
- 2016 – Meir Dagan, Israeli general (born 1945)
- 2016 – Zoltán Kamondi, Hungarian director, producer, and screenwriter (born 1960)
- 2018 – Mike MacDonald, Canadian comedian (born 1954)
- 2018 – Phan Văn Khải, the fifth Prime Minister of Vietnam (born 1933)
- 2021 – John Magufuli, the fifth President of Tanzania (born 1959)
- 2023 – Lance Reddick, American actor (born 1962)
- 2025 – John Hemingway, Irish fighter pilot, last surviving Battle of Britain pilot (born 1919)
- 2025 – Lee Shau-kee, Hong Kong real estate billionaire (born 1928)

== Holidays and observances ==
- Birthday of Sheikh Mujibur Rahman (Bangladesh)
- Children's Day (Bangladesh)
- Christian feast day:
  - Alexius of Rome (Eastern Church)
  - Gertrude of Nivelles
  - John Sarkander
  - Joseph of Arimathea (Western Church)
  - Patrick of Ireland
  - March 17 (Eastern Orthodox liturgics)
- Evacuation Day (Suffolk County, Massachusetts)
- Saint Patrick's Day, a public holiday in Ireland, Montserrat and the Canadian province of Newfoundland and Labrador, widely celebrated in the English-speaking world and to a lesser degree in other parts of the world.
