= Lyle Hanson =

American politician (1935–2020)

Member of the North Dakota House of Representatives from the 12th district
- In office 1979–2013
- Succeeded by: Jessica Haak

Personal details
- Born: May 11, 1935 Sargent County, North Dakota, U.S.
- Died: December 23, 2020 (aged 85) Jamestown, North Dakota, U.S.
- Party: North Dakota Democratic-NPL Party
- Spouse: Betty
- Education: University of North Dakota, Moorhead State University
- Profession: educator

Lyle L. Hanson (May 11, 1935 – December 23, 2020) was a North Dakota Democratic-NPL Party member of the North Dakota House of Representatives, representing the 12th district from 1979 to 2013. He died on December 23, 2020, aged 85.
