= Aleksander Skotnicki =

- Aleksander Skotnicki (1901–1944), Polish veterinarian, officer of the cavalry reserve of the Polish Army, partisan of the Armia Ludowa
- Aleksander Skotnicki (born 1948), Polish hematologist and transplantologist
