= Casten =

Casten is both a surname and a given name.

== People with the surname Casten ==
- Richard F. Casten (born 1941), American nuclear physicist
- Sean Casten, an Irish-born American entrepreneur and Democratic politician serving as the U.S. representative for Illinois's 6th congressional district.
- Tom Casten, American businessman known for his work on industrial energy recycling.

== People with the given name Casten ==
- Casten Almqvist (born 1962), Swedish businessman
- Casten Nemra (born 1971), politician in the Marshall Islands
