= Upshaw =

Upshaw is a surname of English origin. Notable people with this name include:

- Alexander B. Upshaw (1874–1909), a Crow people ('Apsaroke') American - Indian interpreter and assistant to photographer and writer Edward S. Curtis in documenting Native Americans in the United States
- Cecil Upshaw (1942–1995), American baseball player
- Courtney Upshaw (born 1989), American football player
- Dawn Upshaw (born 1960), American operatic and classical soprano
- Gene Upshaw (1945–2008), American football player
- Grace Upshaw (born 1975), American Olympic track and field athlete
- Jessica Upshaw (1959–2013), American politician and lawyer
- Jody Upshaw (born 2003), Canadian R&B musician
- Kelvin Upshaw (born 1963), American basketball player
- L. W. Upshaw, American college football coach
- Marvin Upshaw (born 1946), American football player
- Orrin Upshaw (1874–1937), American Olympic tug-of-war athlete
- Regan Upshaw (born 1975), American football player
- Reggie Upshaw (born 1995), American basketball player in the Israel Basketball Premier League
- Robert Upshaw (born 1994), American basketball player
- T. D. Upshaw (fl. 1930–1931), American college football coach
- William D. Upshaw (1866–1952), American prohibitionist and politician from Georgia; U.S. representative 1919–27
- Willie Upshaw (born 1957), American baseball player
- Zeke Upshaw (1991–2018), American basketball player
- China Upshaw (born 1978), Celebrity Hair Stylist/Personality
