= James McCord =

James or Jim McCord may refer to:

- James Bennett McCord (1870–1950), American medical missionary, physician, and founder of McCord Zulu Hospital
- James W. McCord Jr. (1924–2017), American CIA officer and Watergate scandal figure
- James I. McCord (1919–1990), Canadian-born president of Princeton Theological Seminary
- Jim Nance McCord (1879–1968), American journalist and governor of Tennessee
- Jim McCord (American football) (1932–2009), American football coach
