= Tom Dosch =

American football player and coach

Current position
- Title: Head coach
- Team: Jamestown
- Conference: NSIC
- Record: 0–11

Playing career
- c. 1990: Dickinson State

Coaching career (HC unless noted)
- 1991: Dickinson State (WR)
- 1992: Belfield HS (ND)
- 1993–1994: North Dakota (GA)
- 1995–2003: North Dakota (OLB/DL)
- 2004–2007: Jamestown
- 2008–2009: Southern Illinois (ST/ILB)
- 2010–2019: Northern State
- 2023–2024: North Dakota (OLB)
- 2025: Jamestown (assoc. HC / STC)
- 2026–present: Jamestown

Head coaching record
- Overall: 78–85
- Tournaments: 0–2 (NAIA playoffs)

Accomplishments and honors

Championships
- 1 DAC (2007); 1 NSIC North Division (2015)

Awards
- NSIC Coach of the Year (2014)

Thomas Dosch is an American college football coach and former player. He is the head football coach at Jamestown, a position he assumed in 2026. Dosch previously served as Jamestown’s head football coach from 2004 to 2007 and is one of only a handful of coaches in program history to lead the Jimmies during multiple tenures.

Dosch also served as the head football coach at Northern State from 2010 to 2019, compiling a 53–57 record and leading the Wolves to the 2015 Northern Sun Intercollegiate Conference North Division championship. He was named NSIC Coach of the Year in 2014 after guiding Northern State to an 8–3 season, the program’s best finish in 15 years.

Prior to returning to Jamestown, Dosch spent two seasons at North Dakota as an outside linebackers coach. He returned to Jamestown in 2025 as an associate head coach and special teams coordinator before being named head coach following the appointment of Brian Mistro to becoming the school's athletic director.

== Coaching career ==
=== Jamestown (first stint) ===
Dosch was named head football coach at Jamestown College in 2004. During his four seasons leading the Jimmies, he compiled a 25–17 record and guided the program to back-to-back winning seasons in 2006 and 2007. His 2007 team finished 9–2 overall, captured a share of the Dakota Athletic Conference championship, and advanced to the NAIA playoffs.

=== Northern State ===
Dosch was hired as head coach at Northern State in December 2009. He inherited a program coming off a 2–9 season and steadily rebuilt the Wolves into a competitive NSIC North Division contender. Northern State posted winning records in five of his final six seasons and won the NSIC North Division title in 2015. His 2014 team finished 8–3, earning him NSIC Coach of the Year honors.

=== Return to Jamestown ===
Following a coaching stop at North Dakota and a return to Jamestown as associate head coach and special teams coordinator in 2025, Dosch was named the head football coach in 2026. The appointment marked his second tenure leading the Jimmies football program, nearly two decades after winning the Dakota Athletic Conference championship in 2007.

== Head coaching record ==
| Year | Team | Overall | Conference | Standing | Bowl/playoffs | NAIA^{#} |
|---|---|---|---|---|---|---|
Jamestown Jimmies (Dakota Athletic Conference) (2004–2007)
| 2004 | Jamestown | 5–5 | 5–4 | T–4th | | |
| 2005 | Jamestown | 3–7 | 3–4 | T–4th | | |
| 2006 | Jamestown | 8–3 | 5–2 | T–2nd | L NAIA First Round | 14 |
| 2007 | Jamestown | 9–2 | 6–1 | T–1st | L NAIA First Round | 11 |
| Jamestown: | | 25–17 | 19–11 | | | |
Northern State Wolves (Northern Sun Intercollegiate Conference) (2010–2019)
| 2010 | Northern State | 2–9 | 2–8 / 2–4 | T–11th / 5th (North) | | |
| 2011 | Northern State | 5–6 | 4–6 / 4–2 | T–9th / 3rd (North) | | |
| 2012 | Northern State | 6–5 | 6–5 / 5–2 | T–7th / T–3rd (North) | | |
| 2013 | Northern State | 4–7 | 4–7 / 3–4 | T–10th / 5th (North) | | |
| 2014 | Northern State | 8–3 | 8–3 / 6–1 | 4th / 2nd (North) | | |
| 2015 | Northern State | 6–5 | 6–5 / 6–1 | T–7th / T–1st (North) | | |
| 2016 | Northern State | 6–5 | 6–5 / 4–3 | 8th / T–4th (North) | | |
| 2017 | Northern State | 6–5 | 6–5 / 5–2 | T–6th / 3rd (North) | | |
| 2018 | Northern State | 4–7 | 4–7 / 3–4 | T–10th / 5th (North) | | |
| 2019 | Northern State | 6–5 | 6–5 / 4–3 | T–7th / 4th (North) | | |
| Northern State: | | 53–57 | 52–56 / 42-26 | | | |
Jamestown Jimmies (Northern Sun Intercollegiate Conference) (2026–present)
| 2026 | Jamestown | 0–11 | 0–10 / 0–6 | T–13th / 7th (North) | | |
| Jamestown: | | 0–11 | 0–10 | | | |
| Total: | | 78–85 | | | | |
National championship Conference title Conference division title or championship game berth
