= Kudowa-Zdrój =

Spa town in Lower Silesian Voivodeship, Poland

- Spa town
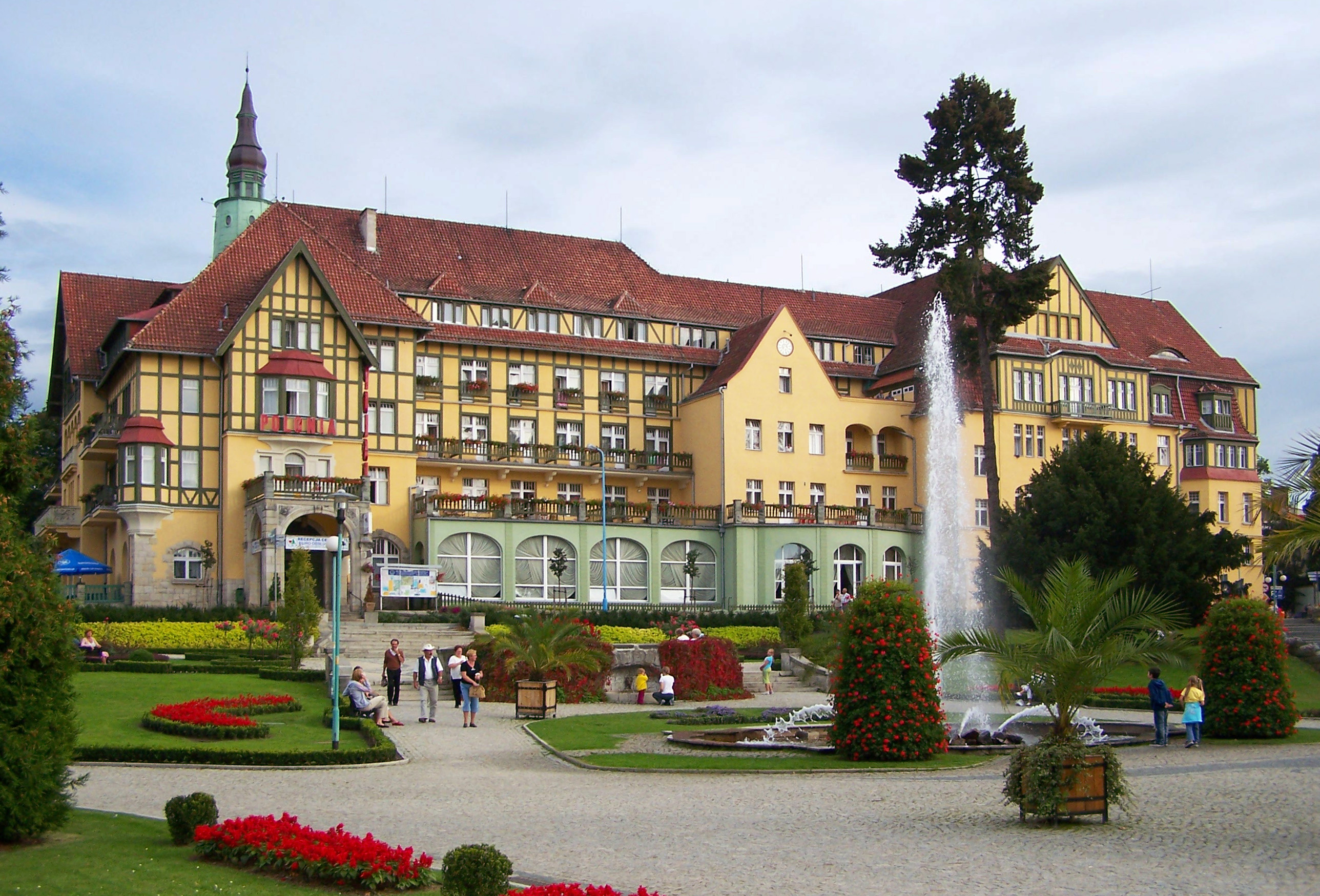
- Sanatorium Polonia

- Flag Coat of arms

- Location within Poland
- Coordinates: 50°26′18″N 16°14′23″E
- Country: Poland
- Voivodeship: Lower Silesian
- County: Kłodzko
- Gmina: Kudowa-Zdrój (urban gmina)
- Founded: 1354
- Town rights: 1945

Area
  - Total: 34 km^{2} (13 sq mi)
- Highest elevation: 420 m (1,380 ft)
- Lowest elevation: 370 m (1,210 ft)

Population (2019-06-30)
  - Total: 9,892
  - Density: 290/km^{2} (750/sq mi)
- Time zone: UTC+1 (CET)
  - Summer (DST): UTC+2 (CEST)
- Postal code: 57-350, 57-351
- Area code: (+48) 74
- Vehicle registration: DKL
- Website: http://www.kudowa.pl

Kudowa-Zdrój [kuˈdɔva ˈzdrui̯], (Note: German: Bad Kudowa, Czech: Chudoba) often simplified to Kudowa, is a spa town located below the Table Mountains in Kłodzko County, Lower Silesian Voivodeship, in southwestern Poland. It has a population of around 10,000 and is located at the Czech–Polish border, just across from the Czech town of Náchod, some 40 km (25 mi) west of Polish Kłodzko and 140 km (87 mi) of Prague.

Kudowa-Zdrój is one of the oldest European spa towns where heart and circulatory system diseases were cured. The downtown area features a park styled on 17th century revival, with exotic plants and a mineral water pump room. Due to its location, the town is famous for tourism, hiking and as the departure point for trips.

The town has several historical and heritage sites such as the Chapel of Skulls within the Czermna district of Kudowa, an ossuary containing the bones or skeletal remains of thousands. It is one of a few of its kind in Europe. Another site is the Basilica of Wambierzyce, nicknamed "Silesian Jerusalem", and one of the most popular Catholic pilgrimage destinations in Poland.

== History ==
Kudowa-Zdrój is one of the oldest spa resorts in Poland and Europe. It is first mentioned in a document by Henry the Elder (1448–1498), son of the Hussite Czech king George of Podebrady. The original name of the village was Lipolitov but in the mid-16th century it was changed to Chudoba, later on Kudoba (Cudoba in the 19th century), Bad Kudowa and into Kudowa-Zdrój in 1945.

The oldest part of Kudowa is Czermna, dating back to the 16th century. The first record of a mineral waters in the area comes from 1580 from the chronicles of Louis of Náchod, under the name Cermenske Lazne. In 1625 (or, as some sources say, as early as 1621), G. Aelurius, a Protestant Lutheran monk, wrote in his work "Glaciografia" about the great taste of the mineral waters from Kudowa.

Kudowa was part of Bohemia under the Holy Roman Empire until 1742 when, together with the rest of the county of Kladsko, it passed to Prussia. From 1818 until 1945, it was known as Bad Kudowa, and was part of the Prussian province of Lower Silesia. Between 1871 and 1945 it was part of unified Germany. Owing to the development of business and industry, a railway line to Kłodzko (then under the name Glatz) and a local power plant grew in importance.

Memorial plaques to professors Adolf Duflos, Julian Aleksandrowicz and Antoni Falkiewicz, honoured for their contributions to the spa in Kudowa

In 1847, Kudowa was visited by 300 patients. In 1850, Adolf Duflos made a chemical analysis of the local waters and claimed they have healing traits. Local doctor J. Jacob helped to establish the notion that Kudowa is a spa that helps heart related diseases, which had a significant impact on the number of people visiting the town. In 1900, the number of people who visited was 4,150.

The spa was very popular amongst Poles; its guests included Fryderyk Skarbek, economist and godfather to Fryderyk Chopin, Julia Molińska-Woykowska, poet and writer, and Fryderyk Skobel, professor at the Jagiellonian University, all of whom reviewed the spa favourably. Julia Molińska-Woykowska noted that three languages were predominantly spoken in the town: German, Polish and Czech. The spa was also frequented by sizeable numbers of Jews, particularly from the Austrian and Russian partitions of Poland.

In 1891, German-American editor Hermann Raster visited Kudowa-Zdrój due to failing health. He died there in July of that same year.

In 1920, the Gebrüder Martin und Paul Polka O.H.G. company bought the largest spa resort of the town. Famous visitors included Winston Churchill, Bruno Schulz, and Helmut von Moltke. From 1911 to 1931, Raphael Friedeberg worked as a physician in the Spa.

In the interbellum, the German administration renamed most district names to erase traces of Slavic origin, only the district of Zakrze (then under the Germanized name Sackisch) retained its name, despite also being of Slavic origin.

During World War II, the Germans established and operated a subcamp of the Gross-Rosen concentration camp for Jewish women in the Zakrze district, as well as other forced labour camps, among the prisoners of which were also Italian prisoners of war. The story of Italian soldier Luigi Baldan is known. Despite risk Baldan was able to help Jewish women by giving them food, which he in turn received from Poles and Czechs, and he also escaped the camp and hid from Germans with the help of the Czechs. During the war, the spa was converted into a convalescent centre for the Wehrmacht. Kudowa was spared the fighting and destruction of the Second World War.

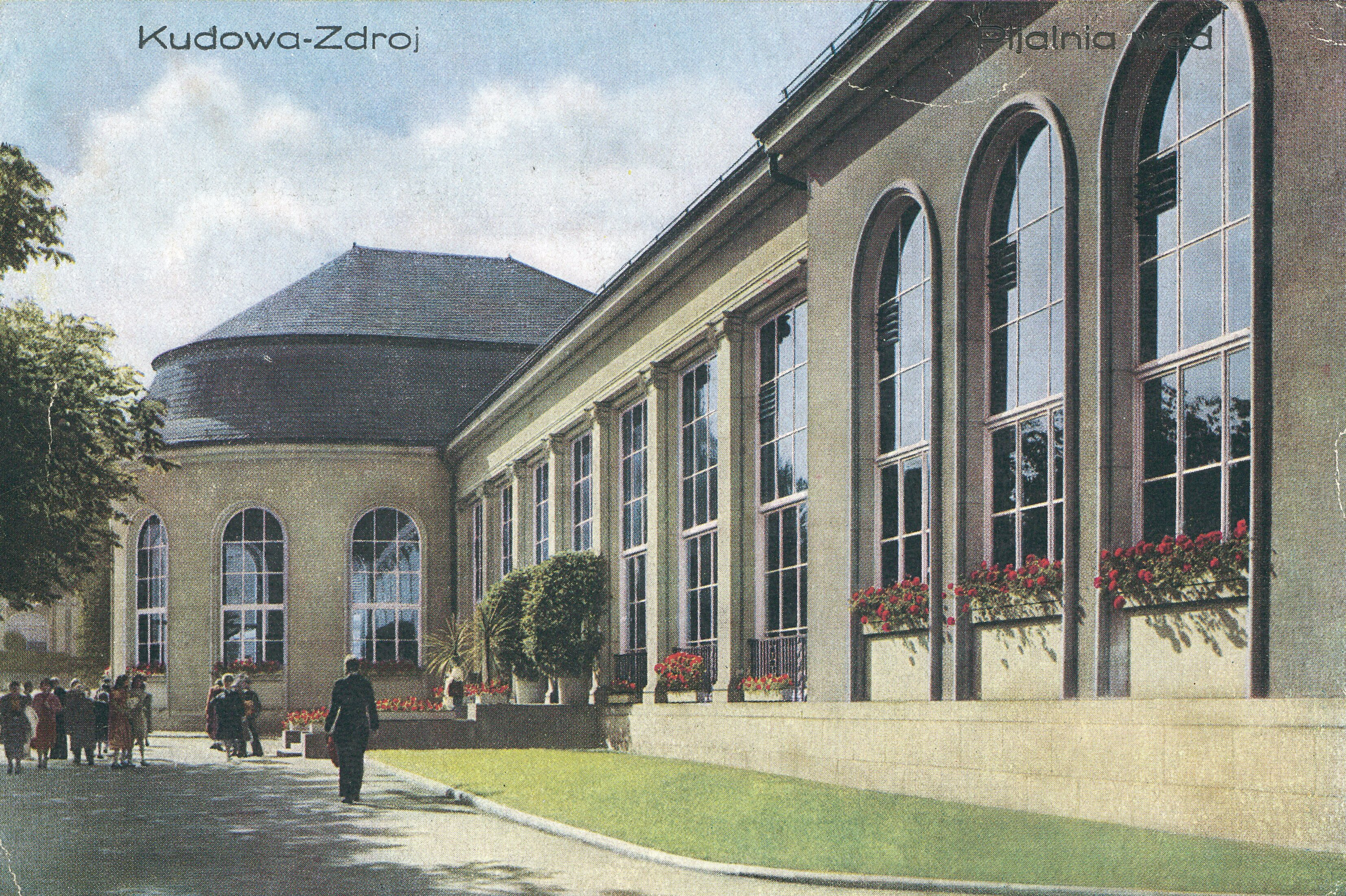
Kudowa pump room in the mid-20th century

After Nazi Germany's defeat in World War II in 1945, most German inhabitants were expelled and Kudowa was repopulated with Polish settlers, most of whom were themselves expelled from former Eastern Poland, annexed by the Soviet Union. After becoming part of Poland it received municipal rights for the first time in its history. After the war, Kudowa-Zdrój became one of the most popular spa towns in Poland.

As the area was a part of the Czech Corner of Kłodzko Land, a population of ethnic Czechs lived in Kudowa-Zdrój (then Bad Kudowa) before 1945. Small groups of Germans and Czechs continued to live in Kudowa until 1960. A German-speaking school was used from 1951 to 1960, and a Czech-speaking school was used from 1947 to 1955 by these small groups. Refugees of the Greek Civil War also settled in the town, as they found employment in the Zakrze textile factory.

Since 1962, Kudowa-Zdrój hosts the annual International Moniuszko Festival, dedicated to the "father of Polish national opera" Stanisław Moniuszko.

== Subdivisions ==
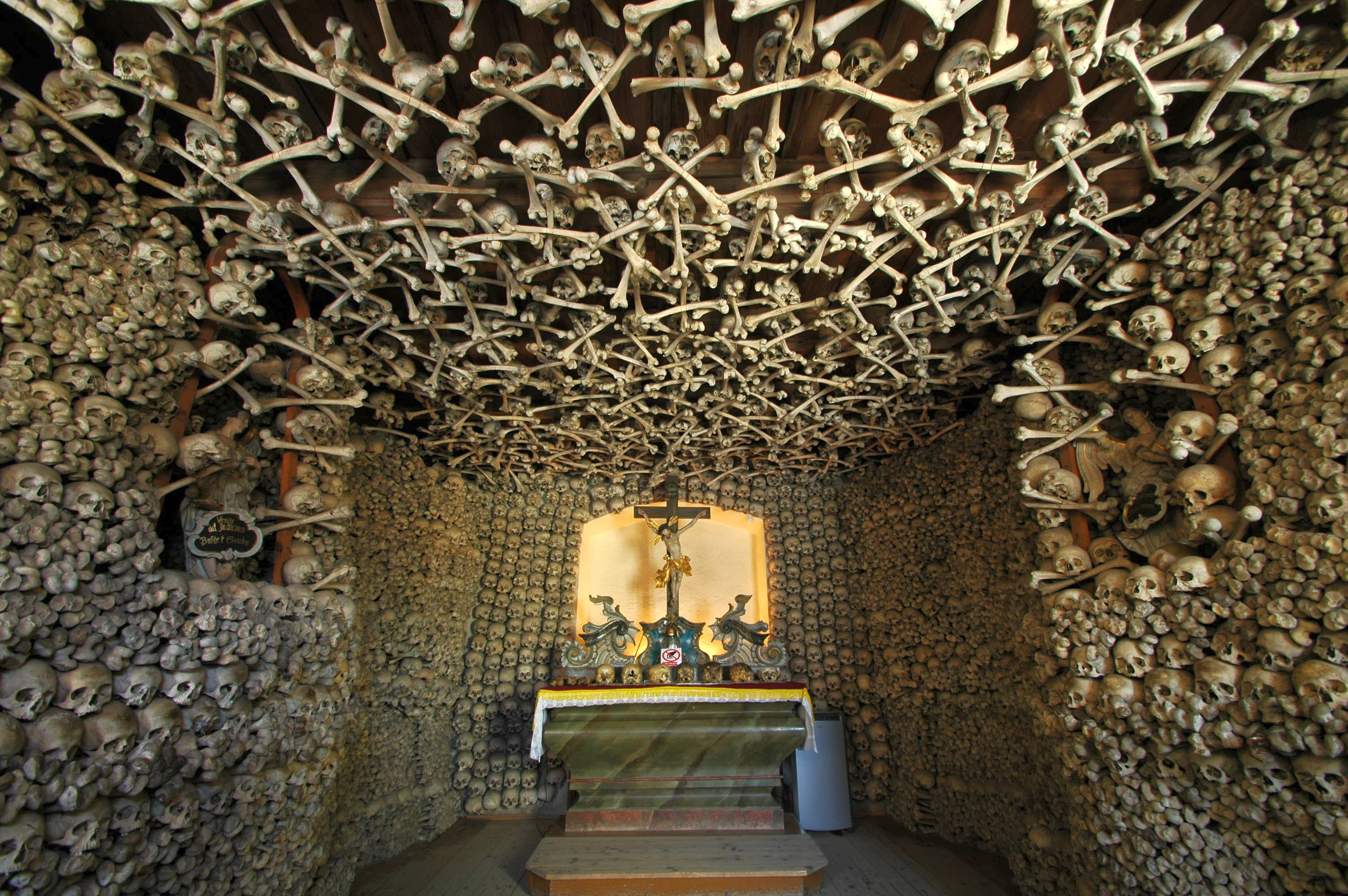
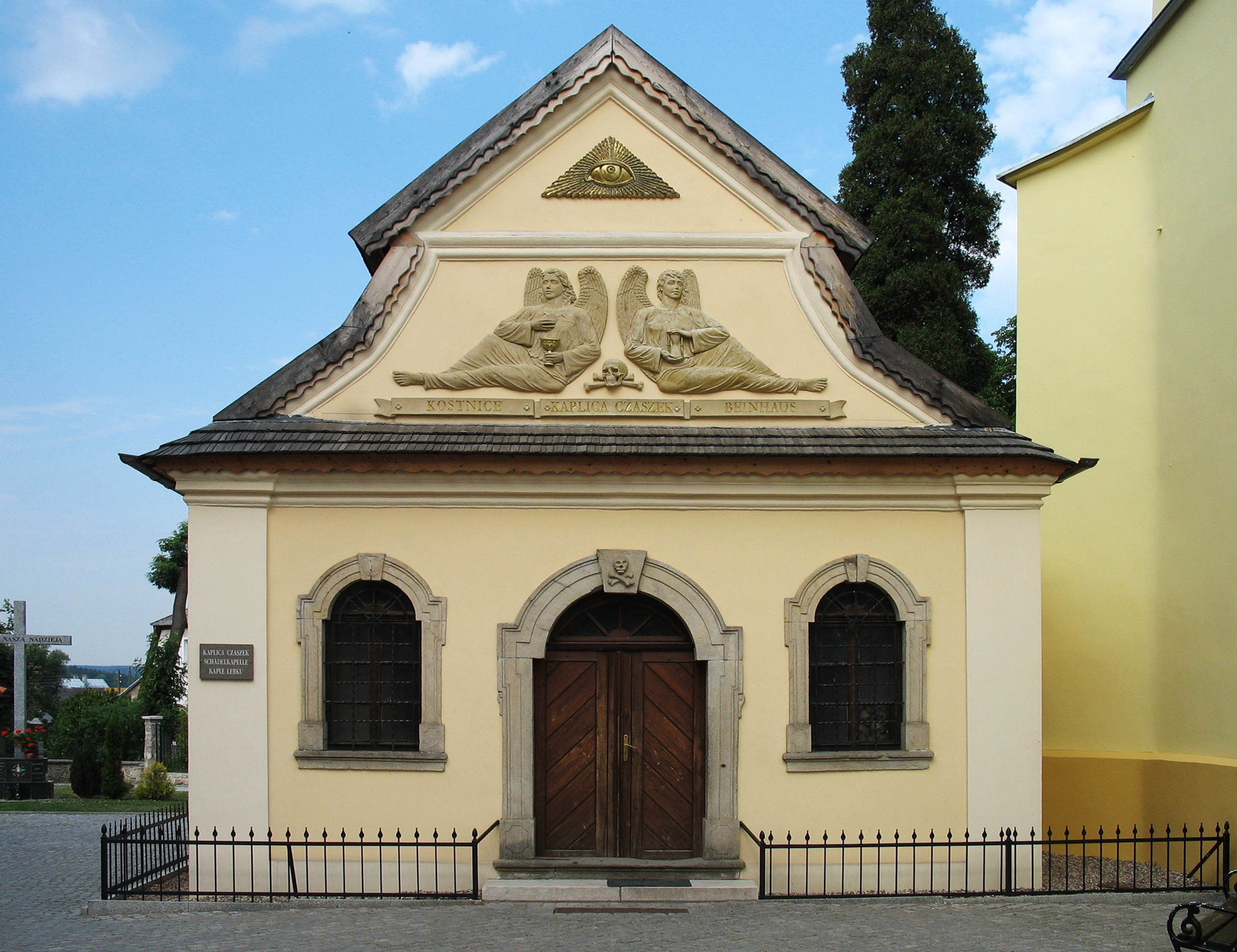
The Czermna Skull Chapel, an ossuary holding thousands of skulls and skeletal remains
- Brzozowie
- Bukowina Kłodzka
- Czermna
- Jakubowice
- Pstrążna
- Słone
- Zakrze

== Sports ==
The local football club is Włókniarz Kudowa-Zdrój. It competes in the lower leagues.

== Twin towns – sister cities ==
Kudowa-Zdrój is twinned with:

- Česká Skalice, Czech Republic
- Horn-Bad Meinberg, Germany
- Hronov, Czech Republic
- Náchod, Czech Republic
- Tuchola, Poland

== Gallery ==
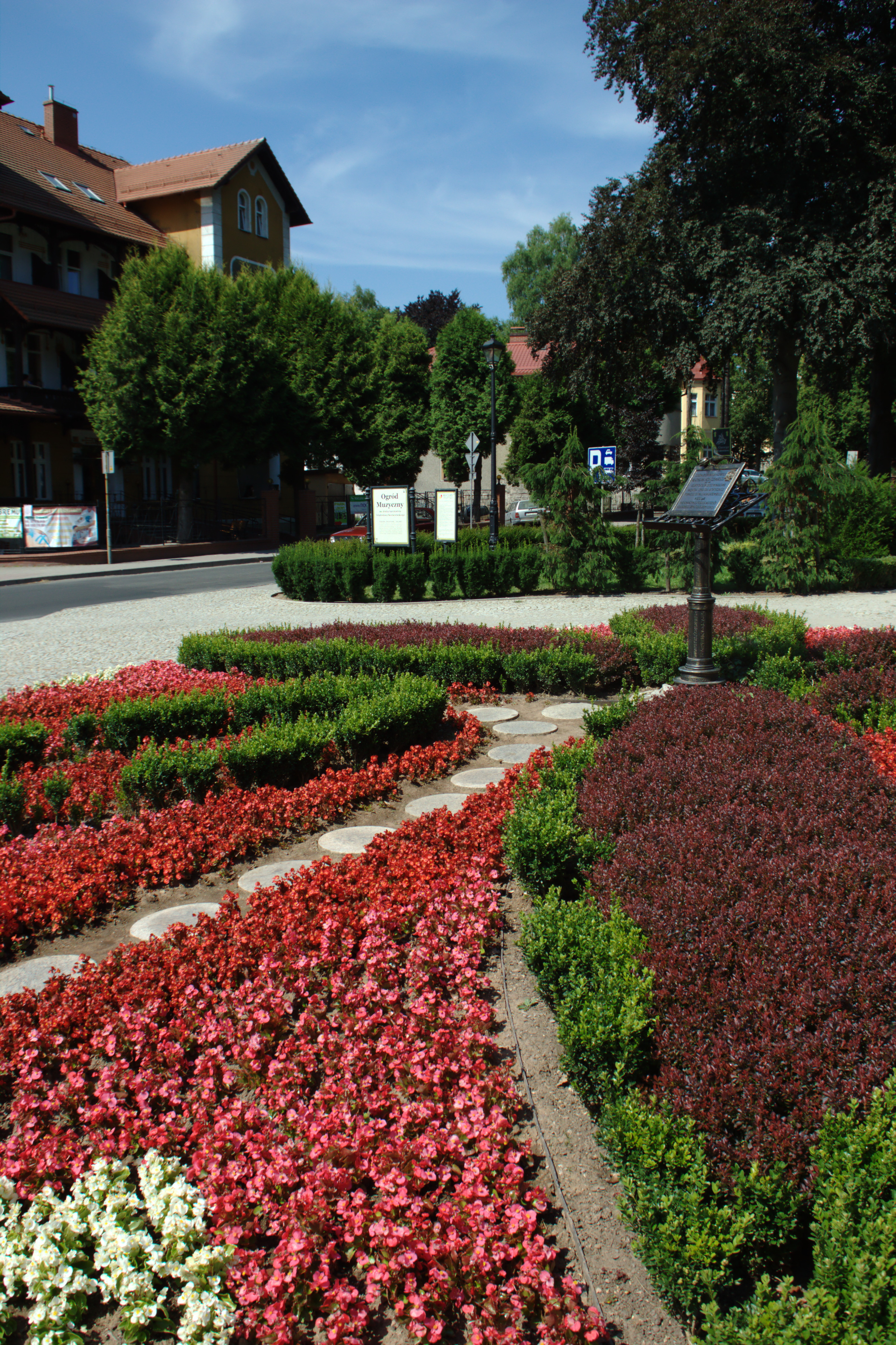
Spa Park

Zameczek sanatorium

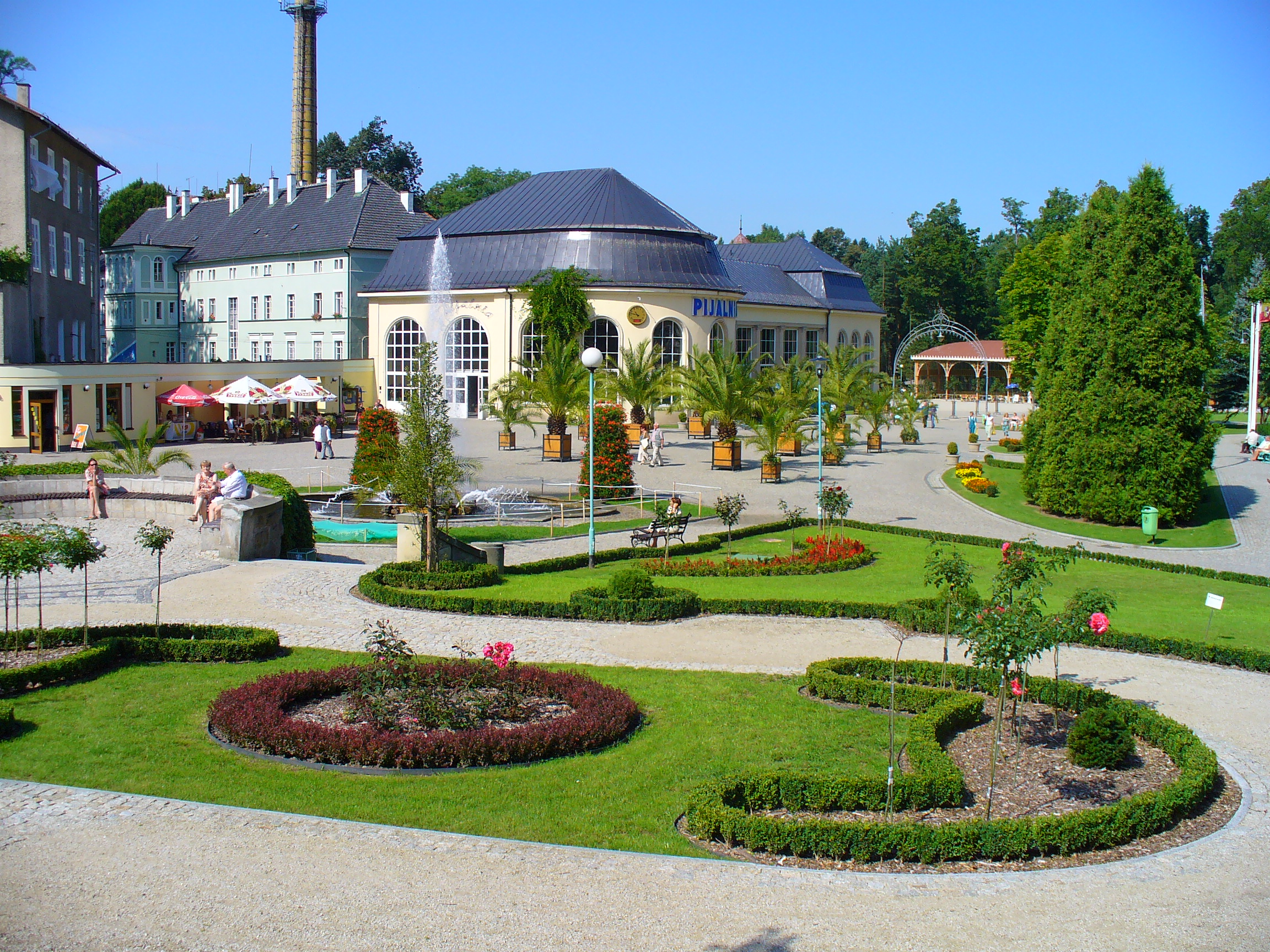
Pump room

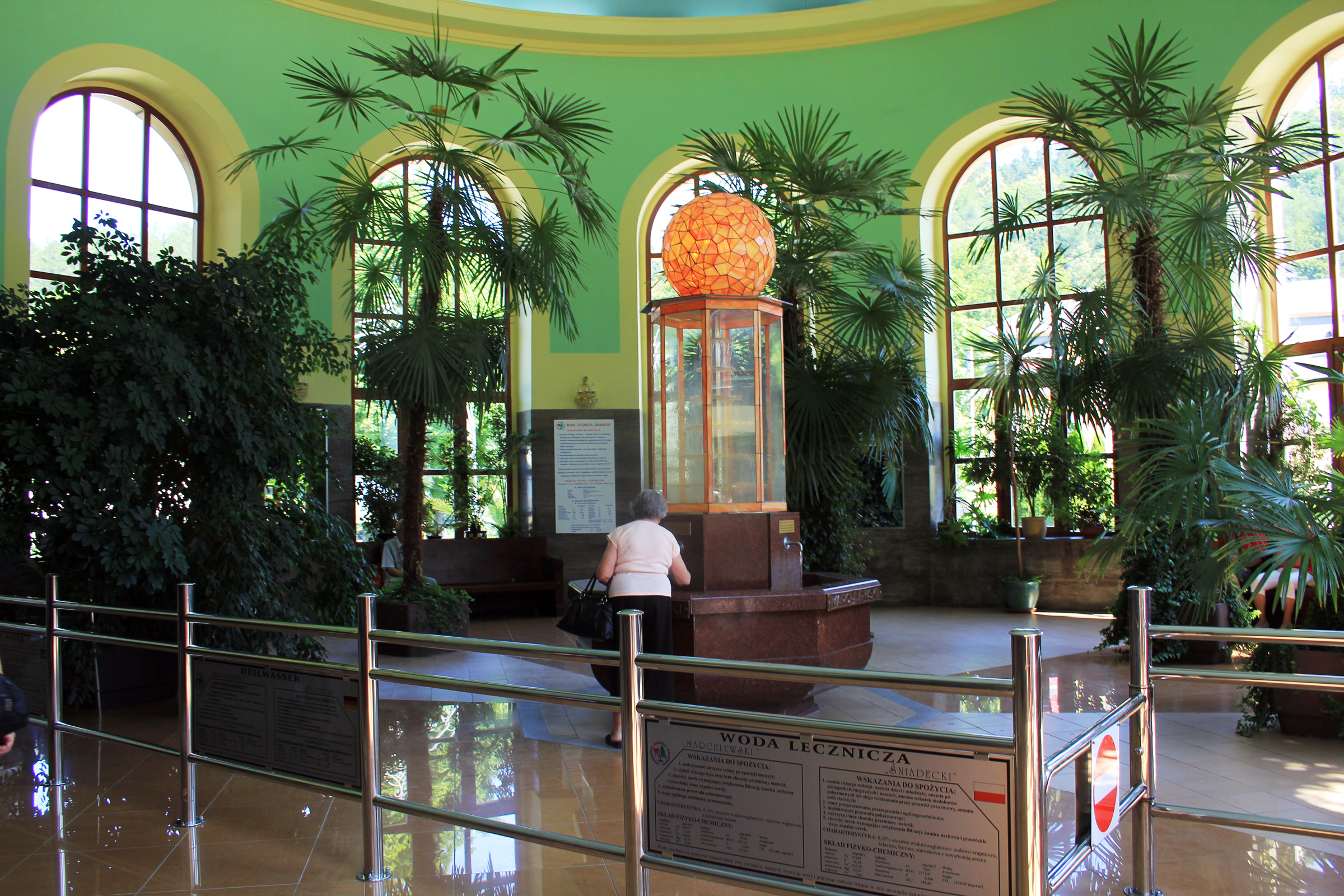
Source of mineral water in pavilon

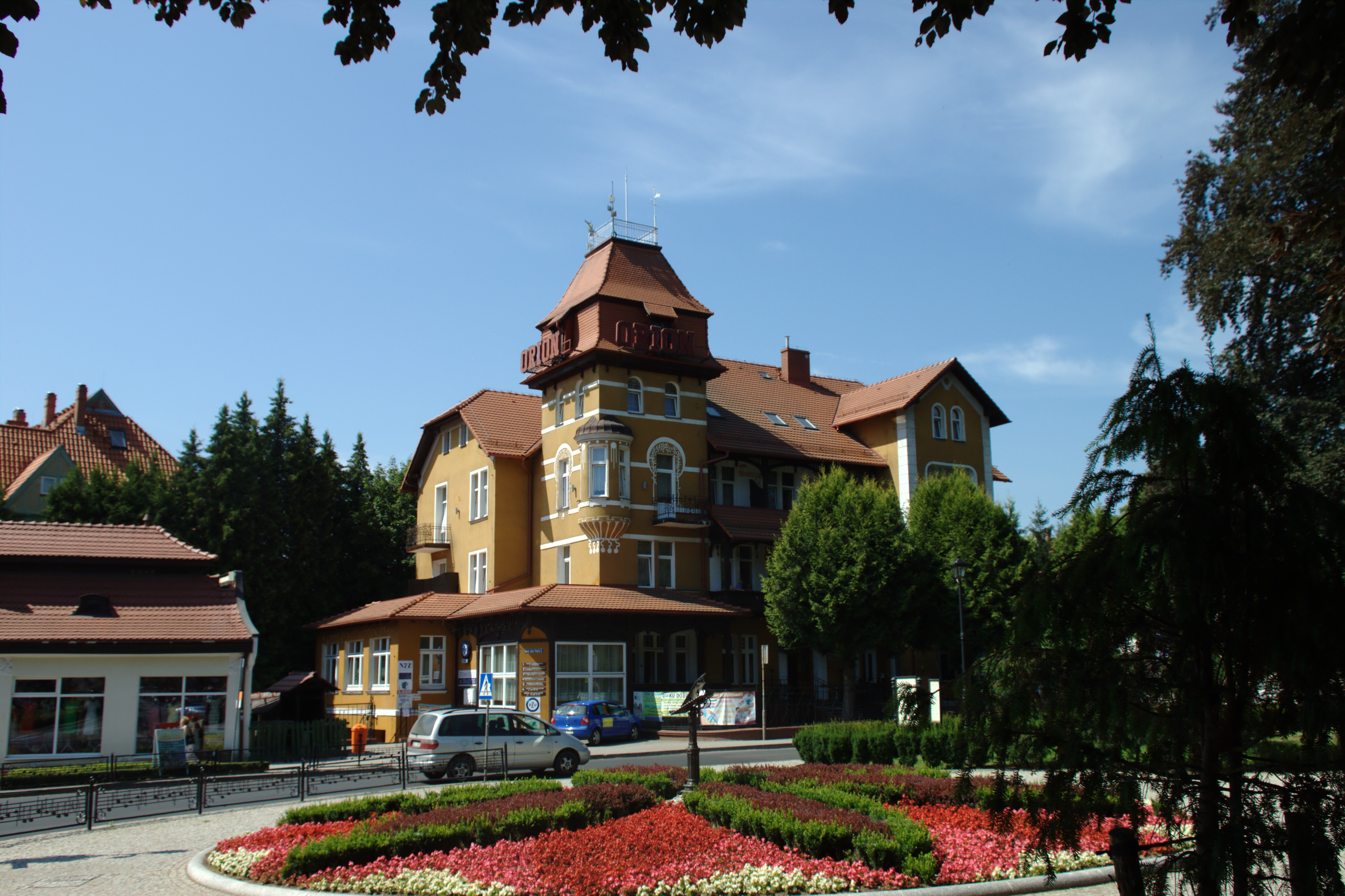
Orion Hotel

Saint Catherine Church

Saint Bartholomew Church

Toys Museum

Town hall

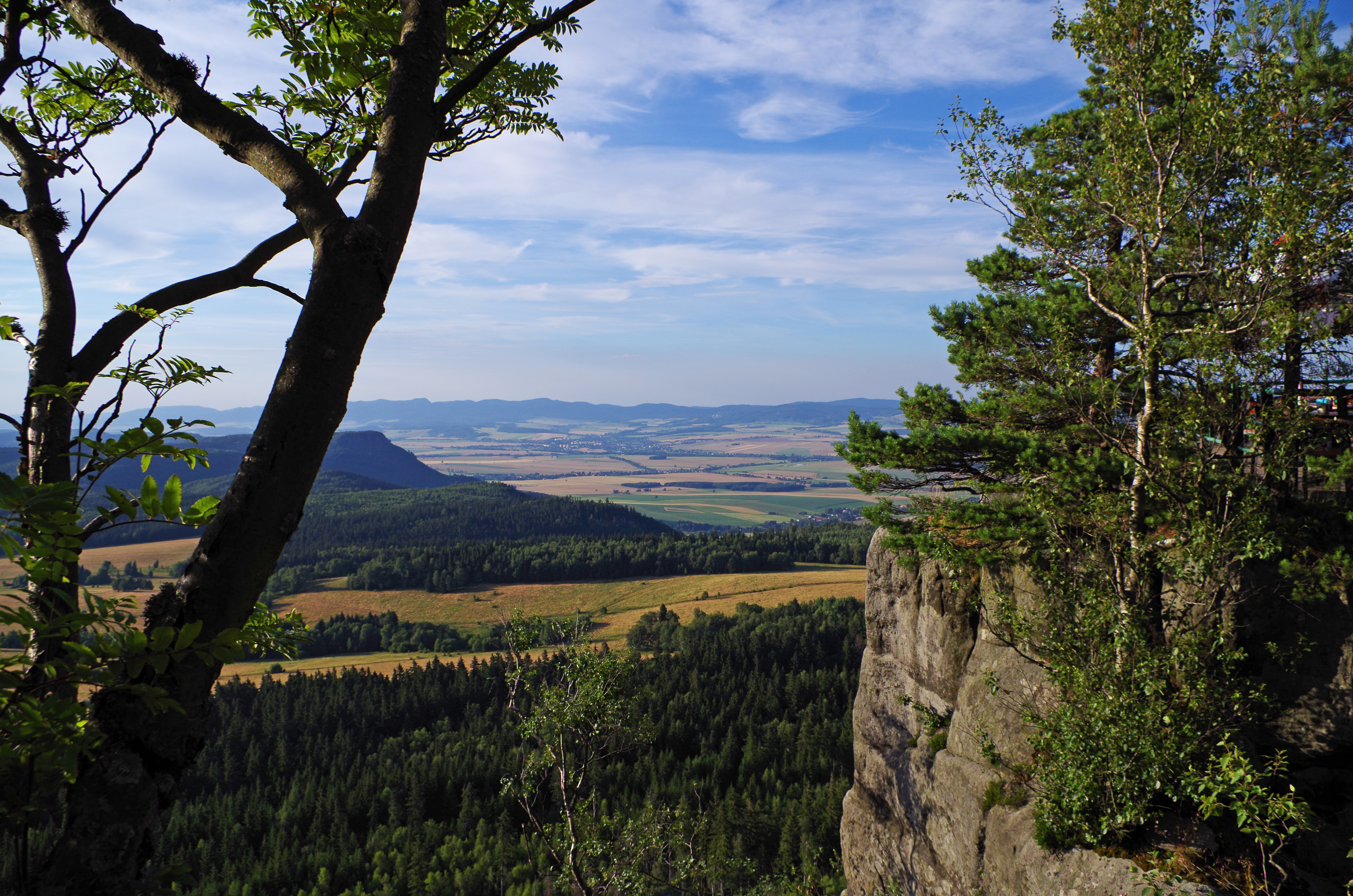
Table Mountains National Park located near Kudowa
