= Cardon V. Burnham =

American musician (1927–2005)

Cardon Vern Burnham Jr.
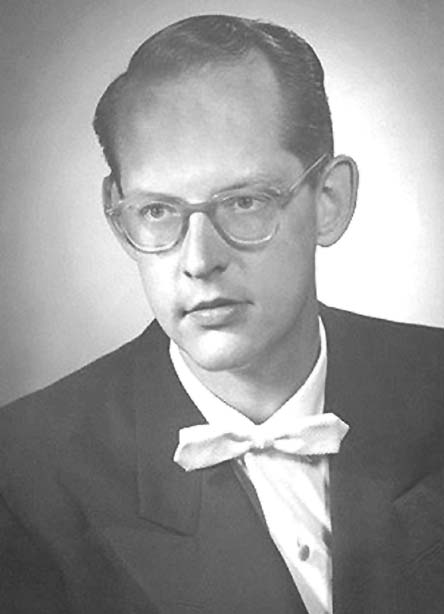
- Born: February 25, 1927; Kewanee, Illinois
- Died: February 19, 2005 (age 77); Oconomowoc, Wisconsin
- Citizenship: U.S.
- Education: Bradley University (B.M.E.), University of Illinois (M.M.), University of Rochester-Eastman School of Music (D.M.A.)
- Known for: Musical composer, arranger, conductor, & performer
- Scientific career
- Fields: Music

Cardon Vern Burnham Jr. (25 February 1927 – 19 February 2005) was an American composer, arranger, conductor, and performer of musical genre. His work included classical, choral, jazz, orchestral, operatic, and chamber music, most notably the opera entitled "Nitecap" which he composed in 1955.

== Early life and military service ==
Burnham was the son of Beulah Decker and Cardon V. Burnham Sr. He grew up in Kewanee, in northwest Illinois, and attended public schools there. Although he was only a teenager, Cardon enlisted in the U.S. Army during World War II and served in the Army Air Corps until 1946. After his discharge from the military, Burnham elected to attend college with government sponsorship through the G.I. Bill.

== Education ==
Cardon enrolled at Bradley University in Peoria, Illinois, and obtained a Bachelor of Music Education degree there in 1949. While still a student, Burnham organized a male choral group called the "Chieftains" at Bradley; it originally comprised military veterans at the school, but its membership was soon broadened to include all interested male vocalists in the student body. Their repertoire was primarily light opera and religious music. After graduating from Bradley, Cardon matriculated to the University of Illinois at Urbana–Champaign and was awarded a Master of Music degree in music theory and composition in 1950. After teaching at a college level for several years, Burnham entered the Eastman School of Music at the University of Rochester, Rochester, New York. He earned his Doctor of Musical Arts degree from that institution in 1960.

== Teaching career ==
Burnham was on the faculty of several colleges and universities during his career. They included Alliance College in Cambridge Springs, Pennsylvania; Tulane University in New Orleans, Louisiana; Bowling Green State University in Bowling Green, Ohio; Carroll College (now Carroll University) in Waukesha, Wisconsin; Hampden-Sydney College in Hampden-Sydney, Virginia; Indiana State University in Terre Haute, Indiana; and Elon University in Elon, North Carolina. He was the Chairperson in the Department of Music at Carroll from 1961 to 1974, and he published several recordings with the Bowling Green State University Collegiate Chorale and A Capella Choir. Burnham principally taught courses in music theory and composition. Among his students was William A. Wojnar, now a classical organist. Burnham's list of distinguished students also included renowned event designer David Beahm as well as Gray Lee, Wayne Hoyle, and Michael Stierhoff - all who studied with Burnham in the early 1980s at what was then known as Elon College.

== Conductorships and compositions ==
Burnham's best-known work was a chamber opera in one act, entitled "Nitecap," which premiered in New Orleans in May 1956. It continues to be performed today. He also composed the background music for another opera, "Electra," that debuted in March 1955. Cardon was Music Director of the Florentine Opera Company in Milwaukee, Wisconsin in the late 1970s; he also directed "An Evening of Scenes from Grand Opera," "La Vie Parisienne," "The Incomplete Education," "Amahl & the Night Visitors," "L'Enfant Prodigue," "The Impresario," "The Poor Sailor," and "The Maid as Mistress." Burnham was a member of the American Society of Composers, Authors and Publishers (ASCAP).

== Personal information ==
Burnham married Barbara Jean Parks, another musician, in June, 1951. They had two children, Christopher Lynn Burnham, and Cheryl Diane Burnham. The marriage ended in divorce in 1980. Burnham developed gastric carcinoma in 2004, and he died of that condition in February of the next year. He is buried in the Southern Wisconsin Veterans Memorial Cemetery in Racine County, Wisconsin.
