= Voorhees Chapel =

Historic church in North Dakota, United States

- U.S. National Register of Historic Places
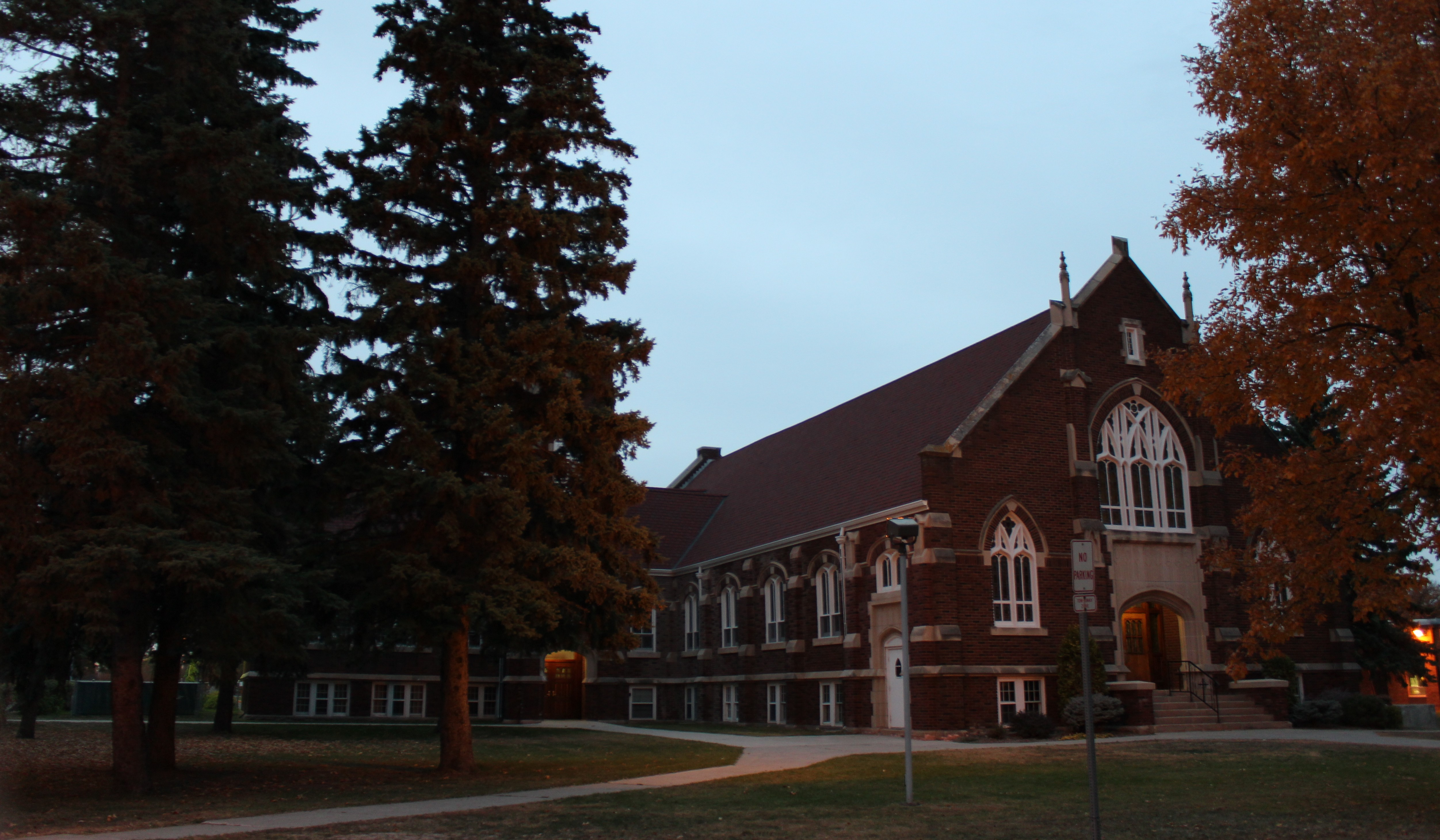

- Location within North Dakota Location within the United States
- Location: University of Jamestown campus, Jamestown, North Dakota
- Coordinates: 46°54′52″N 98°41′57″W
- Area: less than one acre
- Built: 1917
- Architect: Barend H. Kroeze
- Architectural style: Gothic, Collegiate Gothic
- NRHP reference No.: 77001030
- Added to NRHP: July 22, 1977

The Voorhees Chapel on the University of Jamestown campus in Jamestown, North Dakota, was built in 1917. It was designed by architect Barend H. Kroeze in Collegiate Gothic style. It was listed on the National Register of Historic Places in 1977.

It is retardataire in its design.
