= Karl Arnold (disambiguation) =

Karl Arnold (1901–1958) was a German politician.

Karl Arnold may also refer to:

- Karl Arnold (chemist) (1853–1929), German chemist and mountaineer
- Karl Arnold (painter) (1883–1953), German painter
- Karl Arnold (weightlifter) (1940–2012), German Olympic weightlifter

== See also ==
- Carl Arnold (American football), American football coach
- Carl Arnold (composer) (1794–1873), German composer
