= Loila Hunking =

American politician

- Hunking, circa 1972

Member of the South Dakota House of Representatives from the 11th district
- In office 1972–1976

Personal details
- Born: July 21, 1939 (age 87)
- Party: Democratic

Loila Hunking (/loʊˈaɪlə/ low-EYE-luh, born July 21, 1939) is an American politician. She served two terms in the South Dakota House of Representatives as a Democrat.

== Early life and education ==
Hunking was born on July 21, 1939, and grew up in Fessenden, North Dakota. In 1960, she received her Bachelor of Arts from Jamestown College in North Dakota, and later studied at Augustana University, South Dakota State University, and the University of Hawaii.

== Career ==
Prior to entering politics, Hunking worked as an English teacher. In 1965, she became an editor for the Argus-Leader, a daily newspaper in Sioux Falls, South Dakota. She also served on the Board of Directors of the South Dakota Education Association.

In 1972, Hunking won election to the South Dakota House of Representatives, representing the 11th district. She won re-election in 1974.

As Representative, Hunking helped to pass bills that supported women's rights. In 1973, she spoke in support of and voted for the ratification of the Equal Rights Amendment to the United States Constitution, which made South Dakota the 24th state to ratify the amendment. During the same year, she introduced a bill that would prevent schools in South Dakota from receiving federal funds if they did not comply with Title IX, which prohibits American schools from discriminating based on sex. The bill did not pass, but it began discussions regarding sex-based discrimination in education in the state. In a 2014 interview, Hunking remarked that "it caught everybody so off-guard and made people think about the impact. Change was slow, but it began to happen."

In 1983, Hunking was elected to the Sioux Falls City Commission. During her time on the city commission, she created the city's program for snow removal, and instated a sales tax that raised funds for street repairs and city improvements.

In 1996, Governor of South Dakota Bill Janklow appointed her as state coordinator for child care services in the South Dakota Department of Social Services.
