= William A. Wojnar =

American organist

- Born: Milwaukee, Wisconsin
- Occupation: Classical organist
- Title: Professor

Academic background
- Education: University of Illinois Urbana-Champaign; University of Iowa; Carroll University

Academic work
- Discipline: Music
- Institutions: Southern Oregon University University of Jamestown

William A. Wojnar is an American classical organist and a professor emeritus of music at the University of Jamestown, Jamestown, North Dakota.

== Early life and education ==
Wojnar was born in 1951 in Milwaukee, Wisconsin, one of three children of Anthony and Dorothy Wojnar. He attended public schools there and then matriculated to Carroll College (now Carroll University) in Waukesha Wisconsin. Wojnar studied at Carroll as a protégé of the renowned organist, Professor Phyllis Stringham, and was a student of Dr. Cardon V. Burnham, a published composer and director. William obtained his Bachelor of Arts degree in 1974. He then moved to the University of Illinois Urbana-Champaign, completing work on a Master of Arts degree in 1978. After one year of teaching at Southern Oregon University in Ashland, OR, Wojnar joined the faculty at the University of Jamestown. He continued work thereafter on a doctoral degree at the University of Iowa under the direction of Professor Delbert Disselhorst, and ultimately earned his Ph.D. in 1986.

== Career ==
Wojnar is the former chairperson of the Music Department at the University of Jamestown. He taught applied piano and organ, keyboard pedagogy, music theory, and music history. He conducted scholarly research on the music of H.F. Quehl (a baroque composer) in the major music libraries of Germany and Poland. Wojnar was the University of Jamestown Chapel organist, playing the Black-Schlossman Memorial Organ. He has also concertized in the midwest United States and is a member of the AGO.
