= Aleksander Skotnicki (hematologist) =

Polish hematologist (born 1948)

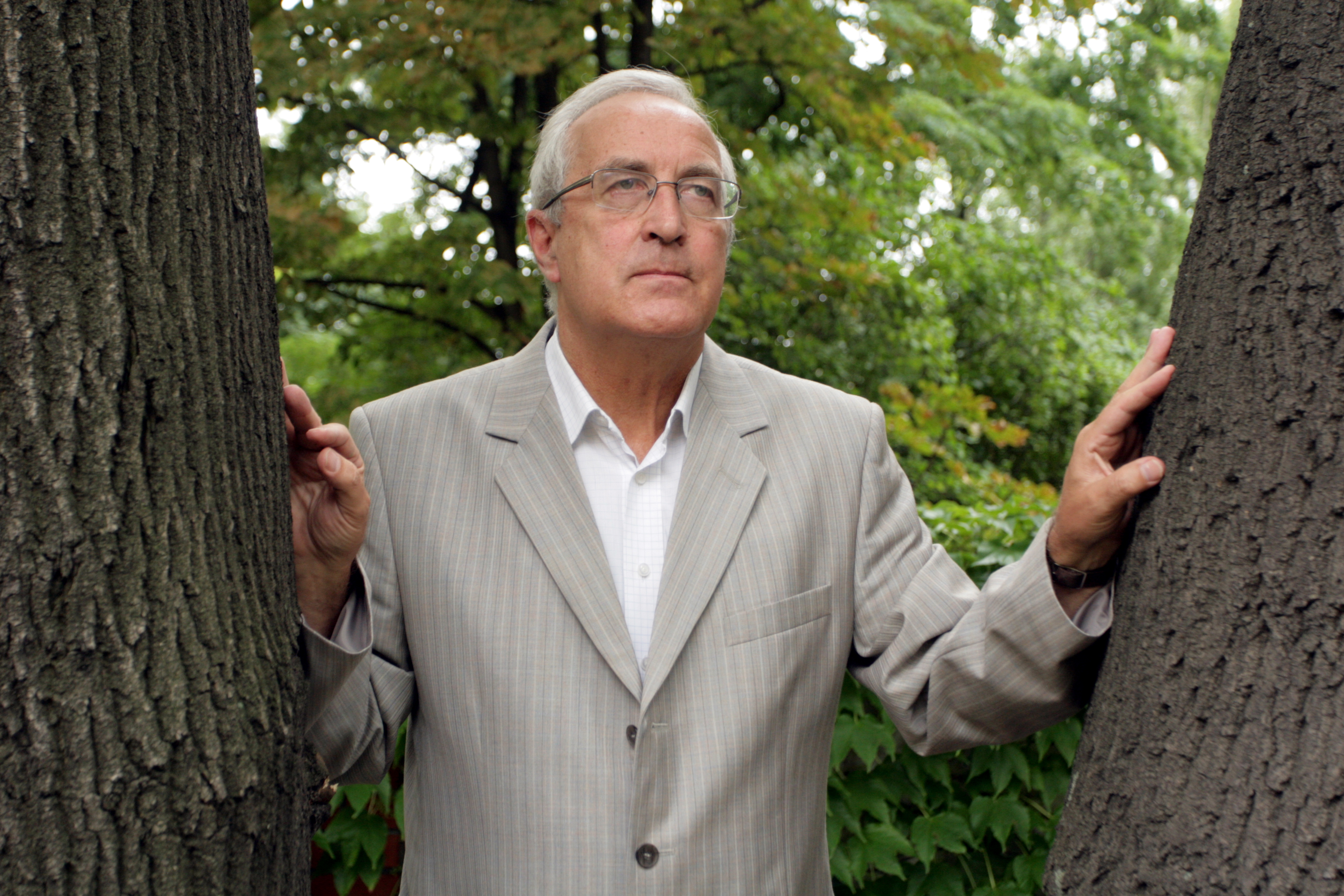
- Born: Aleksander Bartłomiej Skotnicki; 24 August 1948 (age 78)
- Education: Medical Academy in Kraków
- Occupation: Hematologist
- Medical career
- Institutions: Jagiellonian University Medical College; School of Medicine in English
- Sub-specialties: Organ transplantation; internal medicine

Aleksander Bartłomiej Skotnicki (born 24 August 1948) is a Polish hematologist and transplantologist. A specialist in internal medicine, he is a professor of medical sciences, head of the Hematology Clinic of the Jagiellonian University Medical College between 1993 and 2018, an academic lecturer, social activist, and member of the Polish Academy of Learning.

== Early life ==
Skotnicki was born to Roman Skotnicki and Alina (née Sokołowska)—a psychologist, activist of the Polish Society of Mental Hygiene and a worker at the Medical Academy in Kraków. His maternal grandmother was Janina Anna Sokołowska, a high school teacher, social activist and participant of the Polish underground resistance during World War II. Skotnicki attended the Jan III Sobieski High School in Kraków. In 1972 he graduated from the Medical Academy in Kraków. He was a student of Julian Aleksandrowicz.

== Career ==
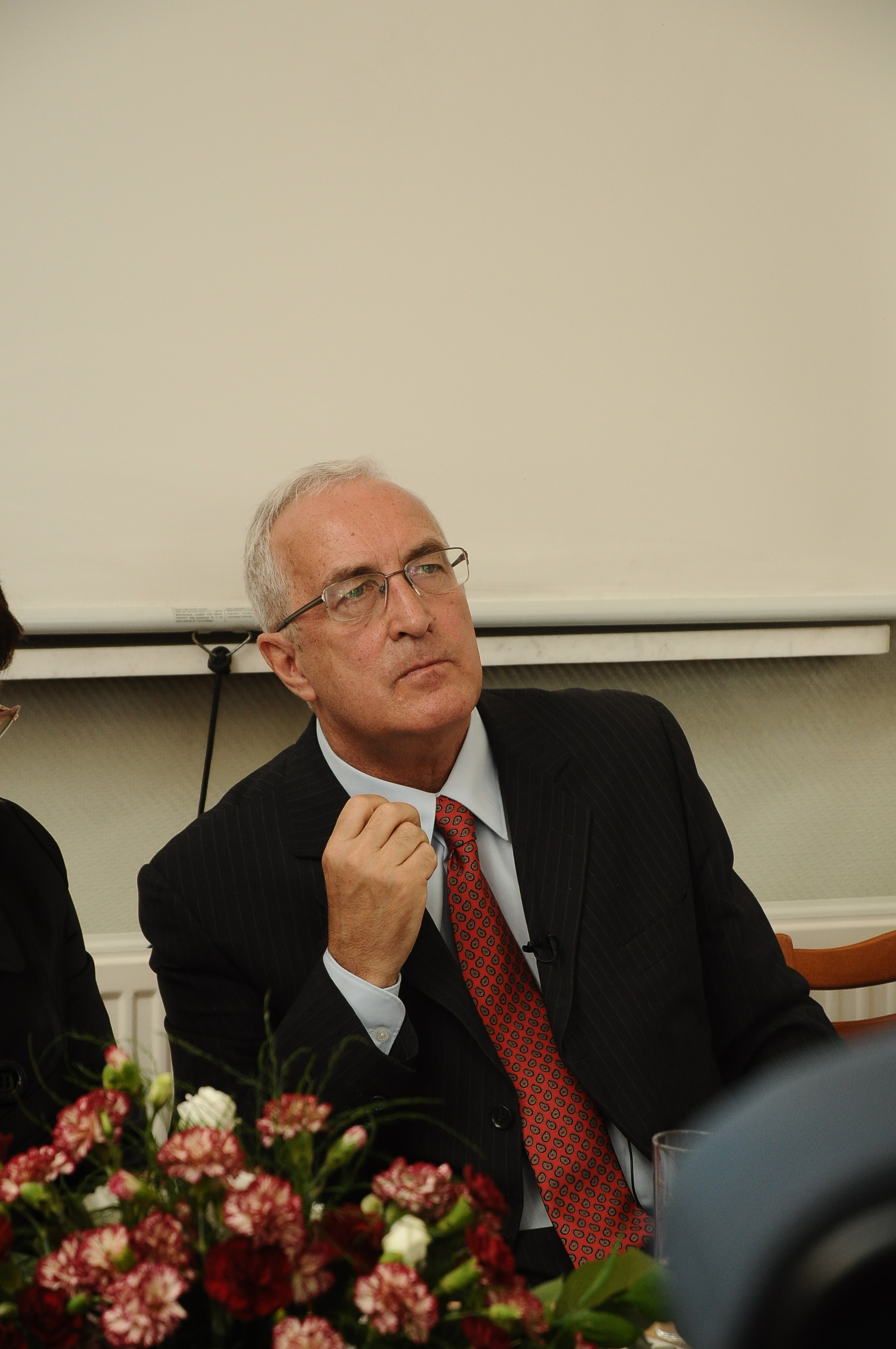
Skotnicki in 2009

In 1995, Skotnicki obtained the title of professor of medical sciences. In the years 1993–2018 he was Head of the Hematology Clinic of the Jagiellonian University Medical College, and participated in creating Kraków's first extensive center for the treatment of tumors of the hematopoietic and lymphoid tissues and the hematopoietic stem cell transplantation.

As author or co-author, Skotnicki published more than two hundred and fifty original research papers in international peer review journals. He lectured at the Medical Academy in Kraków and the Jagiellonian University Medical College, including the School of Medicine in English. He promoted more than twenty doctoral dissertations, and reviewed more than forty doctoral and postdoctoral dissertations.

Skotnicki was elected a member of the Polish Academy of Learning.

== Activism ==
In addition to his clinical and scientific work, Skotnicki has been involved in the works of several non-governmental organizations. He is an honorary member and chairman of the Kraków branch of the Polish Society of Hematologists and Transfusiologists, vice-chairman of the Kraków Medical Society, and president of the board of the "Stradom Dialogue Center" Foundation. He is also the president of the board and one of the founding members of the Julian Aleksandrowicz Foundation for the Prevention and Treatment of Blood Diseases. He was the chairman of the Julian Aleksandrowicz Polish Magnesium Society.

Skotnicki researched issues related to the history of the Jews in Poland, especially the Holocaust, and acted to commemorate the victims of the Shoah. He made contact with Jews who survived the Holocaust, including with people from Schindler's list. He documented the history of people who lived in Kraków who were scattered in the wake of World War II in various parts of the world. Together with the Kraków Photographic Society, he organized photo and documentary exhibitions on Jews in Poland.

Skotnicki has also been organizing annual meetings of patients after hematopoietic stem cell transplantation with the Clinic's team and Jagiellonian University authorities; as well as the annual auctions of works of art for patients with leukemia.

== Personal life ==
Skotnicki is married to Małgorzata Tarczyńska, with whom he has sons Stanisław (born 1982) and Jan (born 1986).

On June 28, 2018, in the Collegium Maius hall of the Jagiellonian University, the jubilee of Aleksander Skotnicki's seventieth birthday took place. The event was attended by the mayor of Kraków, Jacek Majchrowski, the vice-rector of the Jagiellonian University for Medical College, dean of the Faculty of Medicine of the Jagiellonian University, acting director of the University Hospital, president of the Kraków Medical Society and a German consul.

== Works ==
- Skotnicki, Aleksander B; Klimczak, Wladyslaw. Jewish Society in Poland. Wydawnictwo AA, Kraków. 2009.
- Arka. Opowieść o życiu i przetrwaniu. Aleksander Skotnicki in conversation with Katarzyna Kachel and Maciej Kwaśniewski (interview). In Polish. Znak Publishing House, 2019.

== Awards ==
- Golden Badge of the Society for the Fight against Disability (1988)
- Meritorious Medal awarded by the Polish Medical Association (1999)
- Medal of the Polish Military Blood Service (2000)
- Gold Medal of the Prometeusz Foundation – Pro Publico Bono (2000)
- Knight's Cross of Polonia Restituta (2000)
- Aleksander Kremer Medal awarded by the Kraków Medical Society (2006)
- Honoris Gratia Medal awarded by the President of Kraków (2006)
- The Jan Karski and Pola Nireńska Award (2009)
- Jubilee Medal of the 60th anniversary of Medicine Teaching in Lublin
- Bene Meritus from the Polish Medical Association for people working for health protection (2006)
- "Gloria Medicinae" Medal from the Polish Medical Society (2007)
- Kraków Book of the Month Award for the book Oskar Schindler w oczach uratowanych przez siebie Żydów (February 2008)
- Man of the Year 2009 in the plebiscite of Gazeta Krakowska (2010)
- Winner of the Forbes Professional competition in the Małopolska region in the field of medicine (2013)
