= NAIA women's wrestling championship =

Annual college wrestling tournament

- Sport: College wrestling
- Founded: 2021
- Country: United States
- Most recent champion: Life (2nd)
- Most titles: Campbellsville; Menlo; Life (2)
- Website: NAIA.com

The NAIA women's wrestling championship is an annual tournament hosted by the National Association of Intercollegiate Athletics to determine the national champion of collegiate women's wrestling among its members in the United States.

The tournament consists of both a team national title and individual titles at various weight classes. The NAIA voted to approve women's wrestling as its 28th national championship on April 9, 2022. Prior to this, there had been three NAIA women's wrestling national invitational championships. The winners of the Invitational Championships are still recognized as National Champions.

The 2020 National Invitational was canceled due to COVID-19.

The reigning national champions are Life, who won their second title in 2026.

== Results ==
Year	Host city	Team championship			
Year	Host city	Winner	Points	Runner-up	Points
2019	Jamestown, North Dakota	Menlo	230.5	Oklahoma City	154.5
2021	Jamestown, North Dakota	Campbellsville	185	Life	134.5
2022	Jamestown, North Dakota	Campbellsville (2)	189	Southern Oregon	158.5
2023	Jamestown, North Dakota	Southern Oregon	160	Life	139.5
2024	Jamestown, North Dakota	Menlo (2)	172	Life	138
2025	Wichita, KS	Life	190.5	Grand View	120.5
2026	Wichita, KS	Life (2)	169	William Penn	158.5

=== 2023 ===
The 2023 championship took place March 10–11, 2023 at the Harold Newman Arena, on the campus of the University of Jamestown, in Jamestown, North Dakota. It was the first sanctioned collegiate women's wrestling championship. The team championship was won by Southern Oregon University, led by first year head coach, Gabrielle Weyhrich.

==== Team results ====
Rank	Team	Points
1	Southern Oregon	160
2	Life (GA)	139.5
3	Grand View (IA)	123.5
4	Menlo (CA)	123
5	Providence (MT)	102
6	Cumberlands (KY)	98
T7	Central Methodist (MO)	92.5
T7	Iowa Wesleyan	92.5
9	Texas Wesleyan	78.5
10	Campbellsville (KY)	66

==== Individual results ====
Weight	Champion	School	Result	Runner-up	School	Ref.
101	Ira Navarro	University of Providence	2-1	Erin Hikiji	University of Providence	
109	Peyton Prussin	Life	Fall (1:51)	Mia Palumbo	Iowa Wesleyan	
116	Caitlyn Thorne	Central Methodist	10-0 (3:40)	Camille Fournier	Texas Wesleyan	
123	Carolina Moreno	Southern Oregon	6-2	Alana Viva	Menlo College	
130	Lexie Basham	Texas Wesleyan	6-3	Sarah Savidge	Life	
136	Adaugo Nwachukwu	Iowa Wesleyan	15-2 (4:46)	Mea Mohler	Texas Wesleyan	
143	Emily Se	Southern Oregon	3-2	Alexis Gomez	Grand View	
155	Kaylynn Albrecht	Baker	11-8	Latifah McBryde	Life	
170	Dymond Guilford	Cumberlands	Fall (3:59)	Joye Levendusky	Southern Oregon	
191	Grace Kristoff	Southern Oregon	Fall (5:59)	Jaycee Foeller	Central Methodist	

==== Recognition ====
- Coach of the Year – Gabrielle Weyrich (Southern Oregon)
- Outstanding Wrestler – Adaugo Nwachukwu (Iowa Wesleyan)
- Team Sportsmanship – Providence

=== 2024 ===
The 2024 NAIA championship took place March 8-9, 2024 at the Harold Newman Arena, on the campus of the University of Jamestown, in Jamestown, North Dakota. It was the second annual competition and Menlo College won the team championship with 172 points.

==== Team scores ====
Rank	Team	Points
1	Menlo (CA)	172
2	Life (GA)	138
3	Southern Oregon	134
4	William Penn (IA)	111.5
5	Grand View (IA)	106
6	Texas Wesleyan	98.5
7	Providence (MT)	90.5
8	Missouri Baptist	87.5
9	Campbellsville (KY)	54
10	Cumberlands (KY)	53

==== Individual results ====
Weight	Champion	School	Result	Runner-up	School
101	Stefana Jelacic	Lourdes	12-3	Erin Hikiji	Providence
109	Mia Palumbo	William Penn	3-1	Jasmine Howard	Texas Wesleyan
116	Juliana Diaz	Missouri Baptist	7-6	Camille Fournier	Texas Wesleyan
123	Cristelle Rodriguea	Doane	10-0 (1:38)	Maya Davis	Grand View
130	Carolina Moreno	Southern Oregon	11-0 (4:07)	Sarah Savidge	Life
136	Adaugo Nwachukwu	William Penn	Fall (2:16)	Zaynah McBryde	Life
143	Jamilah McBryde	Life	10-0 (2:50)	Emma Walker	Campbellsville
155	Caitlyn Davis	Southern Oregon	4-2	Latifah McBryde	Life
170	Ashley Lekas	William Penn	4-2	Abby McIntyre	Grand View
191	Tavia Heidelberg-Tillitson	Menlo	4-3	Joanna Hendricks	Waldorf

==== Recognition ====
- Coach of the Year – Michael Ayala (Menlo College)
- Outstanding Wrestler – Cristelle Rodriguez (Doane University)
- Team Sportsmanship – University of Providence

== Team titles ==
Team	#	Winning years
Campbellsville	2	2021^{A}, 2022^{A}
Life	2	2025, 2026
Menlo	2	2019^{A}, 2024
Southern Oregon	1	2023

- ^{A} = Women's wrestling first approved for championship status beginning in 2023.

== See also ==
- NCAA wrestling championships (Division I, Division II, Division III)
