= Emmett Etzold =

American football coach

Coaching career (HC unless noted)
- 1995–1999: Jamestown
- 2002–2006: Mary (OC)
- 2007: Mary (QB/RC)
- 2008–2011: Jamestown

Administrative career (AD unless noted)
- 1999–2000: Jamestown

Head coaching record
- Overall: 43–45
- Tournaments: 1–2 (NAIA playoffs)

Accomplishments and honors

Championships
- 2 NDCAC (1997–1998)

Emmett "Bud" Etzold is an American football coach. He served as the head football coach at Jamestown College from 1995 to 1999 and again from 2008 to 2011, compiling a record of 43–45.

== Head coaching record ==
Year	Team	Overall	Conference	Standing	Bowl/playoffs	NAIA^{#}
Jamestown Jimmies (North Dakota College Athletic Conference) (1995–1999)
1995	Jamestown	3–6	1–5	T–5th		
1996	Jamestown	1–8	1–5	6th		
1997	Jamestown	10–1	6–0	1st	L NAIA Quarterfinal	
1998	Jamestown	8–2	5–1	T–1st	L NAIA First Round	
1999	Jamestown	1–8	0–5	6th		
Jamestown Jimmies (Dakota Athletic Conference) (2008–2011)
2008	Jamestown	7–3	5–2	T–2nd		25
2009	Jamestown	5–5	5–3	T–3rd		
2010	Jamestown	5–5	4–4	5th		
2011	Jamestown	3–7	2–4	3rd		
Jamestown:		43–45	29–29			
Total:		43–45				
National championship Conference title Conference division title or championship game berth
