= Carl Ericson =

Swedish ice hockey player

- Born: September 11, 1996 (age 29) Täby, Sweden
- Height: 5 ft 9 in (175 cm)
- Weight: 163 lb (74 kg; 11 st 9 lb)
- Position: Centre
- Shot: Left
- Played for: Leksands IF; Portland Winterhawks; Borlänge HF; Kallinge-Ronneby IF; Visby/Roma HK; IFK Täby HC
- NHL draft: Undrafted
- Playing career: 2014–2024

Carl Ericson (born September 11, 1996) is a Swedish ice hockey player. He is currently playing with Leksands IF of the Swedish Hockey League (SHL).

Ericson made his Swedish Hockey League debut playing with Leksands IF during the 2014–15 SHL season. He was then drafted by the Portland Winterhawks in the 2015 Canadian Hockey League Import Draft and signed a contract with them for the 2015–16 season. However, Ericson was limited to three games due to an injury.
