= Jim McCord (American football) =

American football coach

Biographical details
- Born: November 23, 1932; Minneapolis, Minnesota, U.S.
- Died: September 28, 2009 (aged 76); Bismarck, North Dakota, U.S.

Coaching career (HC unless noted)
- 1964: Jamestown

Head coaching record
- Overall: 1–7

James McCord (November 23, 1932 – September 28, 2009) was an American football coach. He was the head football at Jamestown College—now known as the University of Jamestown—in Jamestown, North Dakota, serving for one season, in 1964, and compiling a record of 1–7. McCord died at Bismarck, North Dakota in 2009. He was buried at North Dakota Veterans Cemetery.

== Head coaching record ==
Year	Team	Overall	Conference	Standing	Bowl/playoffs
Jamestown Jimmies (North Dakota College Athletic Conference) (1964)
1964	Jamestown	1–7	1–5	6th	
Jamestown:		1–7	1–5		
Total:		1–7			
