= Floyd B. Barnum =

American football coach

Biographical details
- Born: March 17, 1892; Cambria, Michigan, U.S.
- Died: February 1965 (aged 7); Hillsdale, Michigan, U.S.
- Education: Hillsdale College

Coaching career (HC unless noted)
- 1921: Jamestown

Head coaching record
- Overall: 1–3–1

Floyd Bates Barnum (March 17, 1892 – February 1965) was American football coach He was the fourth head football coach at Jamestown College—now known as the University of Jamestown—in Jamestown, North Dakota, serving for one season, in 1921, and compiling a record of 1–3–1.

== Head coaching record ==
Year	Team	Overall	Conference	Standing	Bowl/playoffs
Jamestown Jimmies (Independent) (1921)
1921	Jamestown	1–3–1			
Jamestown:		1–3–1			
Total:		1–3–1			
