= Curt Skotnicki =

American football coach

Coaching career (HC unless noted)
- 1997–1999: William Jewell (OC/OL)
- 2000–2003: Jamestown

Head coaching record
- Overall: 17–23

Curt Skotnicki is an American former football coach. He served as the head football coach at Jamestown College—now known as the University of Jamestown—in Jamestown, North Dakota, for four seasons, from 2000 to 2003, compiling a record of 17–23.

== Head coaching record ==
Year	Team	Overall	Conference	Standing	Bowl/playoffs
Jamestown Jimmies (Dakota Athletic Conference) (2000–2003)
2000	Jamestown	3–7	3–6	T–7th	
2001	Jamestown	5–5	5–4	5th	
2002	Jamestown	5–5	5–4	5th	
2003	Jamestown	4–6	4–5	T–5th	
Jamestown:		17–23	17–19		
Total:		17–23			
