= Jessica Haak =

American politician

Member of the North Dakota House of Representatives from the 12th district
- In office 2013–2017
- Succeeded by: Bernie Satrom

Personal details
- Party: Democratic-NPL
- Education: Jamestown College

Jessica Haak is a Democratic-NPL politician who served in the North Dakota House of Representatives, representing the 12th district from 2013 to 2017. While not serving in the legislature, Haak works for the North Dakota Farmers Union.
