= Brian Mistro =

American football coach (born September 3, 1986)

Current position
- Title: Athletic director
- Team: Jamestown
- Conference: NSIC

Biographical details
- Born: September 3, 1986 (age 40); Gilbert, Arizona, U.S.
- Education: Jamestown College (2009); Northern State University (2012)

Playing career
- 2005–2008: Jamestown
- Position: Safety

Coaching career (HC unless noted)
- 2010–2011: Northern State (GA)
- 2012–2013: Concordia–Moorhead (DB)
- 2014–2015: Concordia–Moorhead (co-ST/DB)
- 2016–2018: Concordia–Moorhead (ST/DB)
- 2019–2025: Jamestown

Administrative career (AD unless noted)
- 2026–present: Jamestown

Head coaching record
- Overall: 15–57

Accomplishments and honors

Awards
- All-DAC (2008)

Brian Mistro (born c. September 3, 1986) is an American college football coach and athletics administrator. He currently serves as the athletic director at the University of Jamestown.

Mistro previously served as the head football coach at Jamestown from 2019 to 2025, compiling a 15–57 record while guiding the program through its transition from the Great Plains Athletic Conference (GPAC) to the North Star Athletic Association (NSAA) and ultimately into the Northern Sun Intercollegiate Conference (NSIC).

Before returning to his alma mater, Mistro coached at Northern State and Concordia–Moorhead. He played college football for Jamestown as a safety and earned All-Dakota Athletic Conference honors in 2008.

== Head coaching record ==
Year	Team	Overall	Conference	Standing	Bowl/playoffs
Jamestown Jimmies (Great Plains Athletic Conference) (2019–2023)
2019	Jamestown	2–9	2–7	T–8th	
2020–21	Jamestown	1–7	1–7	9th	
2021	Jamestown	2–9	2–8	T–9th	
2022	Jamestown	4–7	3–7	8th	
2023	Jamestown	2–9	2–8	T–9th	
Jamestown Jimmies (North Star Athletic Association) (2024)
2024	Jamestown	3–7	3–5	4th	
Jamestown Jimmies (Northern Sun Intercollegiate Conference) (2025)
2025	Jamestown	1–9	1–9 / 0–6	T–13th / 7th (North)	
Jamestown:		15–57	14–51		
Total:		15–57			
