= Karl L. Ericson =

American football coach (1895–1965)

Biographical details
- Born: January 21, 1895; Elroy, Wisconsin, U.S.
- Died: August 25, 1965 (aged 70); Harvey, North Dakota, U.S.

Coaching career (HC unless noted)

Football
- 1919–1921: Mandan HS (ND)
- 1922–1929: Jamestown

Basketball
- 1918–1922: Mandan HS (ND)
- 1922–1930: Jamestown

Administrative career (AD unless noted)
- 1922–1930: Jamestown

Head coaching record
- Overall: 23–28–4 (college football)

Karl Leslie "Red" Ericson (January 21, 1895 – August 25, 1965) was an American football and basketball coach and college athletics administrator. He served as the head football at Jamestown College—now known as the University of Jamestown—in Jamestown, North Dakota, for eight seasons, from 1922 to 1929, compiling a record of 23–28–4. Ericson was also the head basketball coach and athletic director at Jamestown.

Ericson was born on January 21, 1895, in Elroy, Wisconsin and moved to North Dakota at the age of 10. After graduating from Jamestown College, he taught and coached at Mandan High School in Mandan, North Dakota.

== Head coaching record ==
=== College football ===
Year	Team	Overall	Conference	Standing	Bowl/playoffs
Jamestown Jimmies (Interstate Athletic Conference) (1922–1929)
1922	Jamestown	1–2			
1923	Jamestown	1–3			
1924	Jamestown	3–4			
1925	Jamestown	0–6–3			
1926	Jamestown	5–3			
1927	Jamestown	3–4–1			
1928	Jamestown	4–4	4–2	3rd	
1929	Jamestown	6–2			
Jamestown:		23–28–4			
Total:		23–28–4			
