= Polish Medical Association =

- Formation: 1951
- Headquarters: Warsaw, Poland
- Location: ul. Aleje Ujazdowskie 22, 00-478 Warszawa
- Members: 25,000
- Website: www.ptl.medserwis.pl

Polish Medical Association (Polish: Polskie Towarzystwo Lekarskie) is a scientific society created in 1951, bringing together physicians of various specialties. The society refers to the tradition of medical societies in Vilnius (Towarzystwo Lekarskie Wileńskie, from 1805) and Warsaw (Towarzystwo Lekarskie Warszawskie, from 1820).

The president of Polish Medical Association is Professor Waldemar Kostewicz. In the structure of the Society there are branches, circles and sections and the main seat is in Warsaw.

Polish Medical Association publishes three scientific journals "Przegląd Lekarski", "Wiadomości Lekarskie" and "Polski Merkuriusz Lekarski" and organizes several cyclic conferences, e.g. the World Congresses of Medical Polonia and the International Conference "Human ecology".
