= Julian Aleksandrowicz =

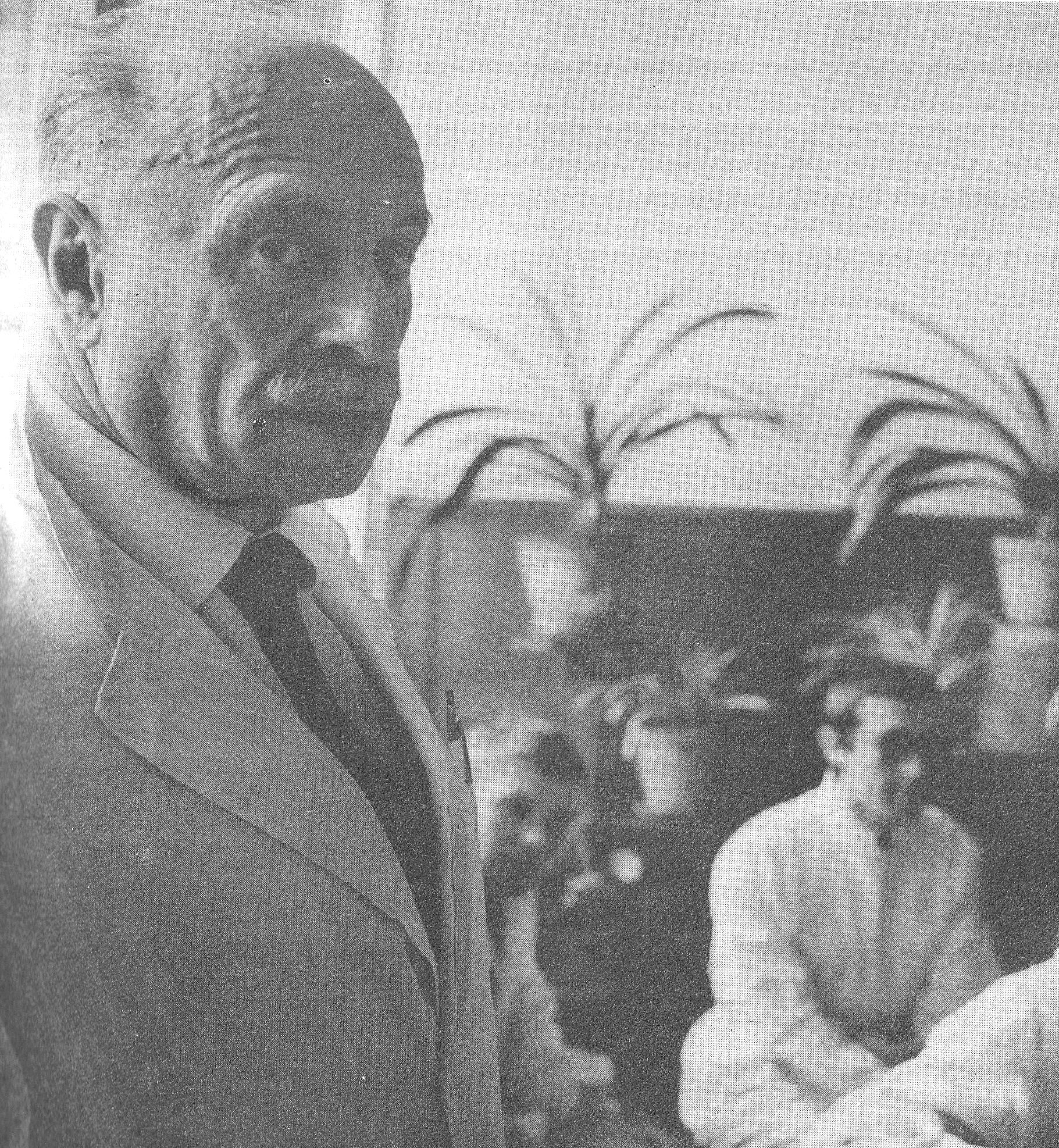
Julian Aleksandrowicz

Julian Aleksandrowicz (Polish pronunciation: [ˈju.ljan a.lɛk.sanˈdrɔ.vit͡ʂ]; 1908 Kraków –1988 Kraków) was a Polish medical professional, professor of medicine, and a notable specialist on leukemia. He is known for having developed concepts of comprehensive psychotherapy of persons suffering from somatic diseases, as well as of the ecological prevention of cancer and leukaemia.

Aleksandrowicz was of Jewish descent, and after German invasion of Poland (during which he fought in the 72nd Infantry Regiment), he was imprisoned in the Kraków Ghetto (he managed to bury his research data beforehand and recover them after the war). He founded one of the three ghetto hospitals. While in the ghetto, he was aided by one of the Polish Righteous, Józef Adamowicz (who was eventually caught and beaten to death by Nazi guards at the ghetto). Later, in 1943, Aleksandrowicz managed to escape the ghetto and became a physician of the Polish resistance, Armia Krajowa in the Kielce-Radom Independent Jodła Region, under a nom-de-guerre Doktor Twardy. Eventually he became a platoon leader. For his participation in the resistance, he received the Silver Cross of the Virtuti Militari.

For most of his life, he lived in Kraków. He was an author of many medical texts (including the first Polish textbook on hematology), and a professor (since 1951) and a director of the notable Hematology Clinic at the Jagiellonian university medical college (1950–1978).

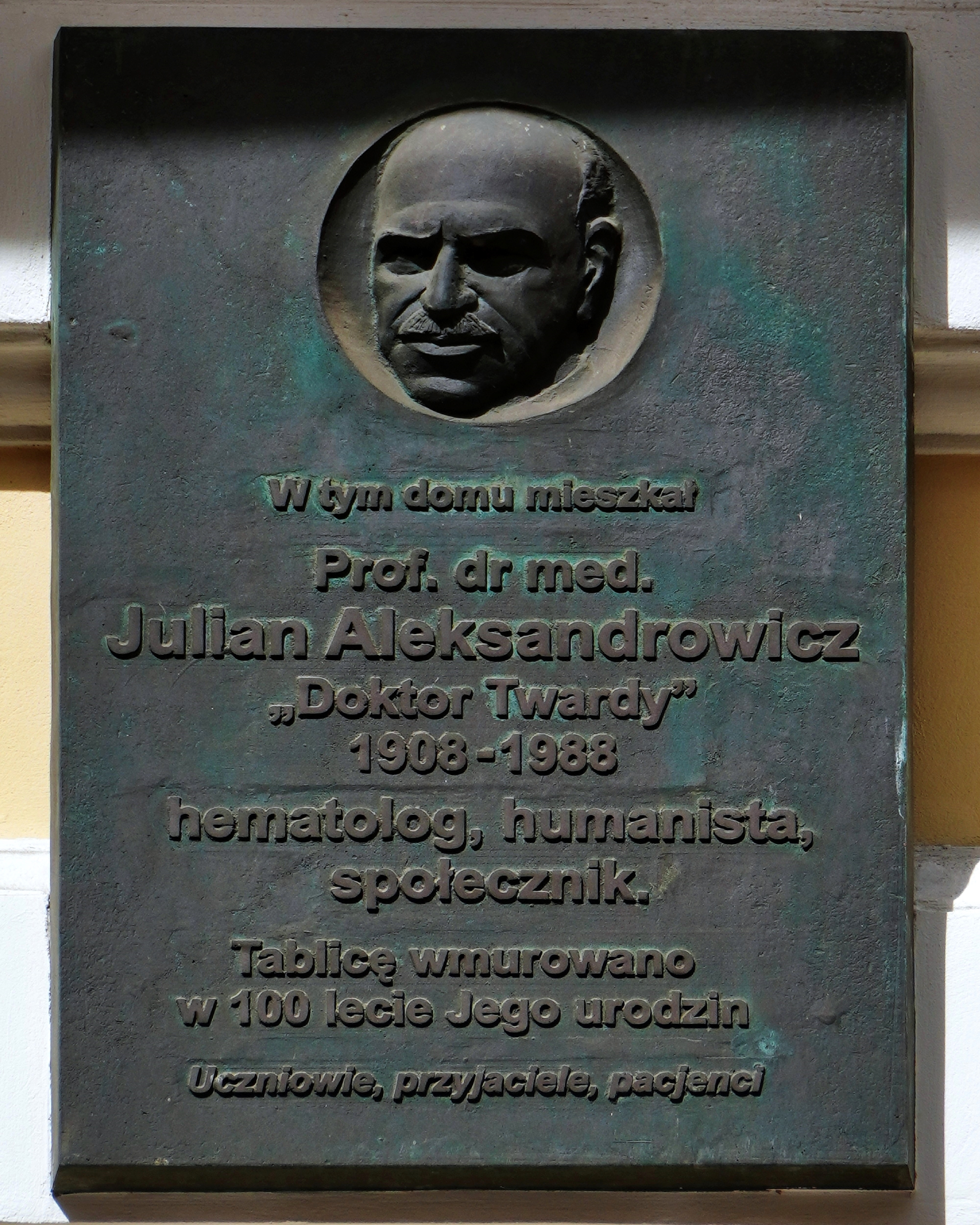
Memorial plaques to Julian Aleksandrowicz in Kraków and Kudowa-Zdrój

== Awards and decorations ==
- Silver Cross of the Virtuti Militari
- Commander's Cross of the Order of Polonia Restituta
- Cross of Merit with Swords
- Cross of Valour
