= L. W. Upshaw =

American football coach

Coaching career (HC unless noted)
- 1919–1920: Jamestown

Head coaching record
- Overall: 1–1–1

L. W. Upshaw was an American football coach. He was the third head football at Jamestown College—now known as the University of Jamestown—in Jamestown, North Dakota, serving for two seasons, from 1919 to 1920, and compiling a record of 1–1–1.

== Head coaching record ==
Year	Team	Overall	Conference	Standing	Bowl/playoffs
Jamestown Jimmies (Independent) (1919–1920)
1919	Jamestown	0–1			
1920	Jamestown	1–0–1			
Jamestown:		1–1–1			
Total:		1–1–1			
