= Casten Almqvist =

Swedish CEO (born 1962)

Casten Åke Loritz Almqvist (born 17 March 1962) is a Swedish executive. He was the Swedish CEO for TV4 Media 2011–2022. December 2019–2022 he was also part of Telia Company's group executive management team leading the business area TV/Media.

He has also been the CEO of McCann-Erickson and the CEO of channels TV3, TV6 ad ZTV at MTG.

== Biography ==
Almqvist was born in Stockholm. He graduated from Journalisthögskolan in Stockholm in 1986. Almqvist has worked as a journalist and television producer for Strix Television and SVT.

In 2008, he became CEO of Dagens Industri and Bonnier Business Press. In 2011, he was appointed CEO of TV4 and in 2013 head of the business area Bonnier Broadcasting, extending the scope to also include C More and Finish MTV Media. He was appointed "Digital Change Leader of the Year" in 2016 due to his work with accelerating the digital transformation at TV4 and Bonnier Broadcasting. TV4 was the most profitable commercial broadcaster in Europe in 2019 and 2020.

During the fall of 2021, Almqvist was appointed chairman of the board at Bonnier Books that owns Bonnierförlagen in Sweden, WSOY in Finland, Bonnier Media Deutschland as well as BookBeat, among others. Bonnier Books is operating in seven countries and have a revenue of around 7 billion SEK.
