= Carl Arnold (American football) =

American football coach

Biographical details
- Education: St. Cloud State University

Coaching career (HC unless noted)
- 1947–1948: Jamestown

Head coaching record
- Overall: 1–13–1

Carl Arnold was an American football coach. He was the head football coach at Jamestown College—now known as the University of Jamestown—in Jamestown, North Dakota, serving for two seasons, from 1947 to 1948, and compiling a record of 1–13–1. Arnold was an alumnus of St. Cloud State University in St. Cloud, Minnesota.

== Head coaching record ==
Year	Team	Overall	Conference	Standing	Bowl/playoffs
Jamestown Jimmies (North Dakota Intercollegiate Conference) (1947–1948)
1947	Jamestown	1–5–1	1–3–1	6th	
1948	Jamestown	0–8	0–5	T–8th	
Jamestown:		1–13–1	1–8–1		
Total:		1–13–1			
