= University of Jamestown =

Christian university in Jamestown, North Dakota, US

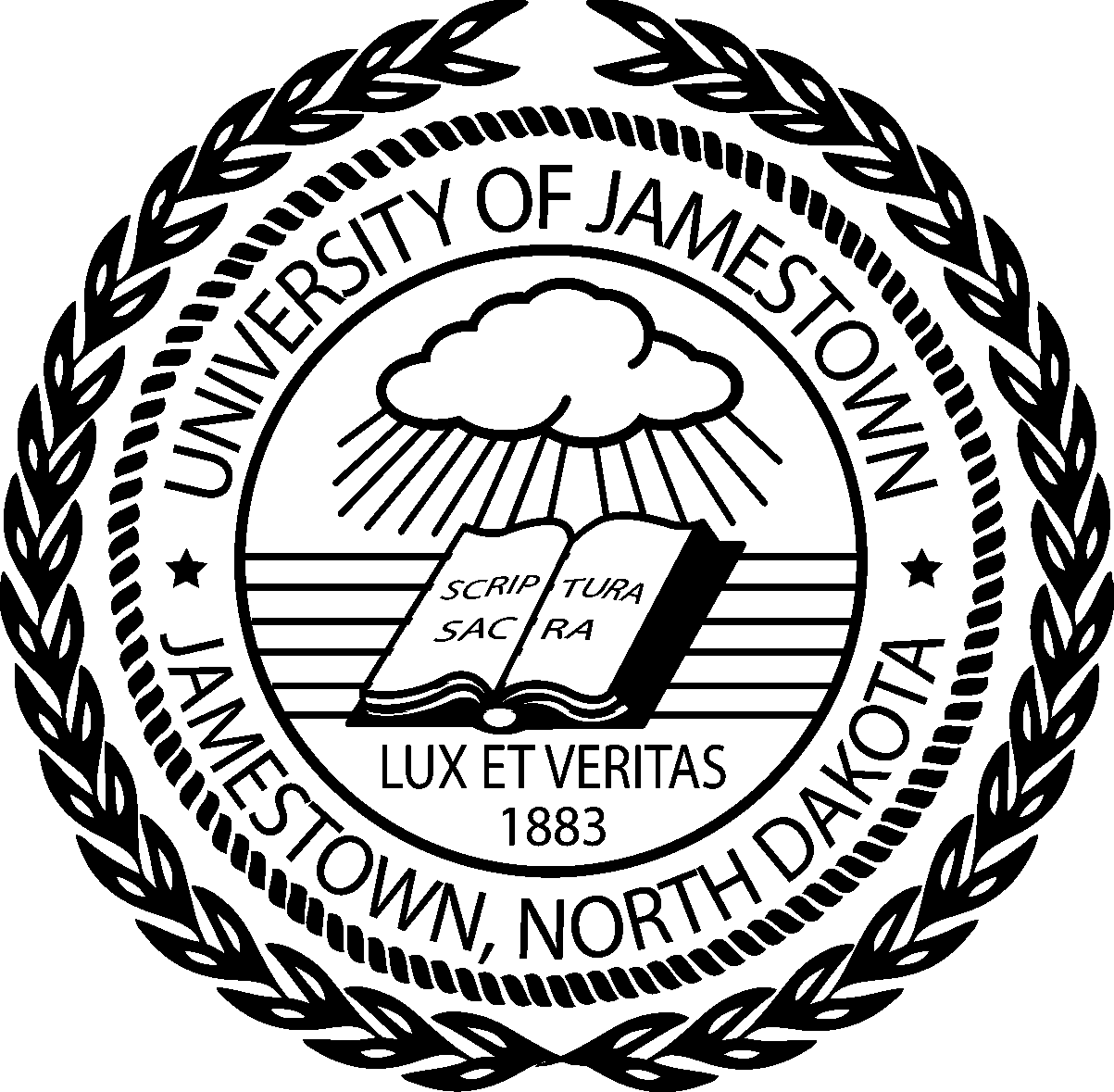
- Former name: Jamestown College (1883–2013)
- Motto: Latin: Lux et Veritas
- Motto in English: Light and Truth
- Type: Private university
- Established: 1883; 143 years ago
- Religious affiliation: Presbyterian Church
- Academic affiliations: APCU
- Endowment: $45 million
- President: Polly Peterson
- Provost: Paul J. Olson
- Students: 1,290
- Location: Jamestown, North Dakota, U.S. 46.914°N 98.698°W
- Campus: Urban, 110 acres (45 ha))
- Colors: Orange & Black
- Nickname: Jimmies
- Sporting affiliations: NCAA – NSIC – ACHA
- Mascot: Jimmie
- Website: www.uj.edu
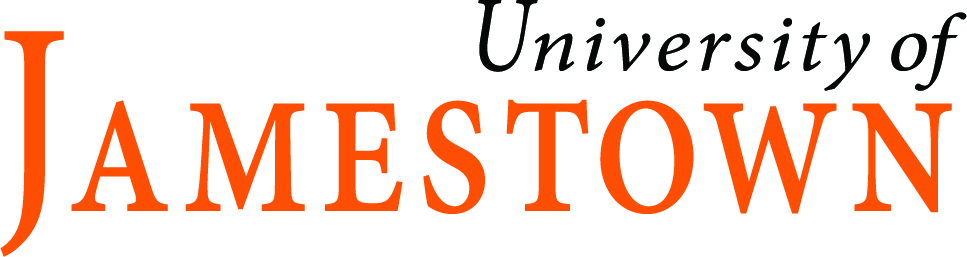

The University of Jamestown is a private Christian university in Jamestown, North Dakota, United States. Founded in 1883 by the Presbyterian Church, it has about 1,300 students enrolled and has been co-educational from its founding. Until August 2013, the school was known as Jamestown College.

== History ==
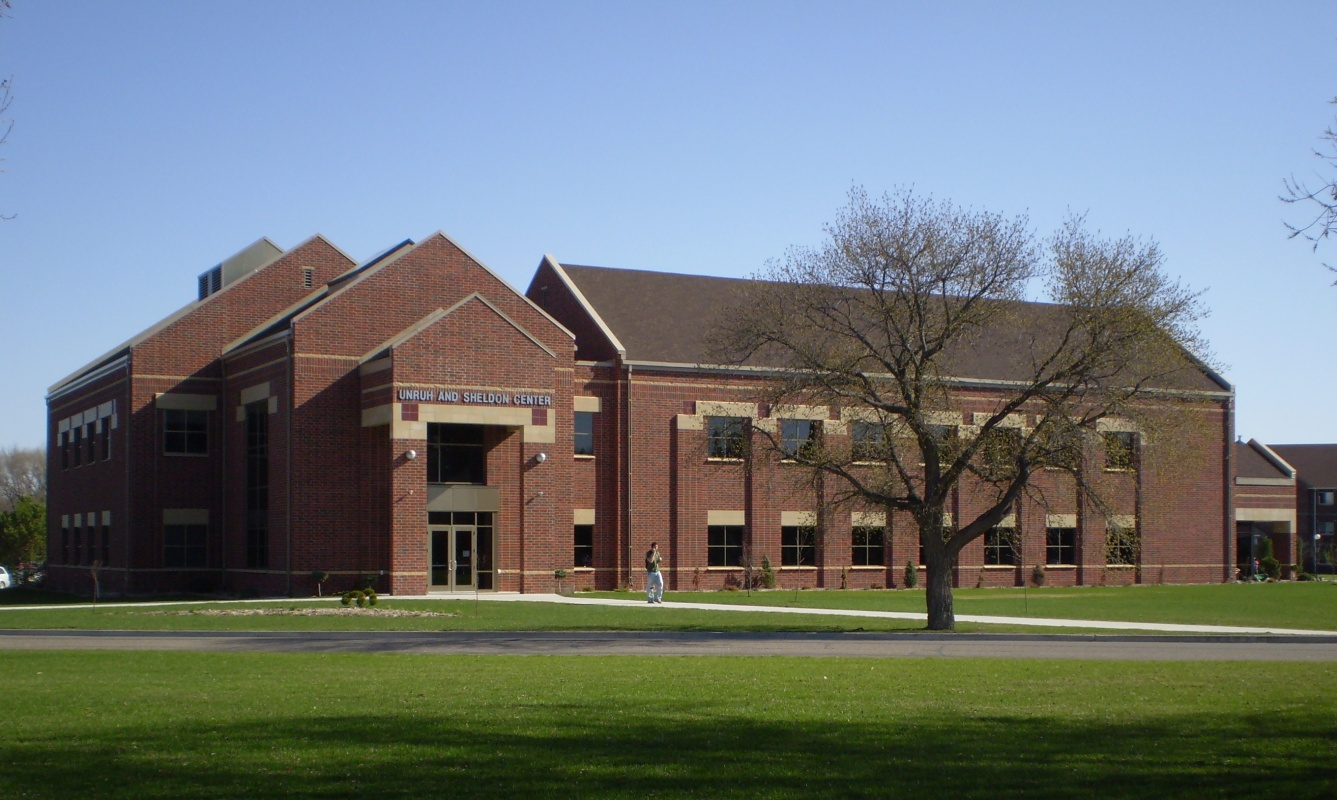
The Unruh and Sheldon Center for Business and Computer Science

The University of Jamestown was founded as Jamestown College in 1883, but closed during the depression of 1893. The school reopened in 1909 and has remained in operation ever since.

In 1979, Jamestown College's football team went to the NAIA National Championships.

Two graduates of the institution have become Rhodes Scholars.

In 2013, in light of a new master's program and applied doctorate degree program, Jamestown College changed its name to the University of Jamestown.

In 2018, Dr. Robert Badal retired from his position as university president after serving in the role for nearly 16 years. He was succeeded by Dr. Polly Peterson, a 1989 graduate of the university.

== Athletics ==
The Jamestown athletic teams are called the Jimmies. The university is a member of the National Collegiate Athletic Association (NCAA). Starting in 2025–26, the Jimmies are members of the Northern Sun Intercollegiate Conference (NSIC). Three sports not sponsored by the NSIC compete elsewhere—men's soccer and women's wrestling as independents, and men's volleyball in the Great Lakes Valley Conference. Previously, they were members of the North Star Athletic Association (NSAA), which they were members from 2013–14 to 2017–18, and again in 2024–25. The Jimmies previously competed in the Great Plains Athletic Conference (GPAC) from 2018–19 to 2023–24, and in the defunct Dakota Athletic Conference (DAC) from 2000–01 to 2011–12, as well as an NAIA Independent within the Association of Independent Institutions (AII) during the 2012–13 school year.

Jamestown competes in 24 intercollegiate varsity sports: Men's sports include baseball, basketball, cross country, football, golf, ice hockey (ACHA Division 1 and Division II), soccer, track and field (indoor and outdoor), volleyball and wrestling; while women's sports include basketball, cross country, golf, ice hockey, soccer, softball, swimming & diving, track & field (indoor and outdoor), volleyball and wrestling; and co-ed sports include eSports and shotgun sports.

In 2023, the first sanctioned NAIA women's wrestling championship was held at the Harold Newman Arena, on the Jamestown campus.

== Notable people ==
=== Alumni ===
- Richard K. Armey (1962), U.S. Representative from Texas and House Majority Leader
- Ron Erhardt (1953), head coach of the NFL New England Patriots
- Ralph R. Erickson (1980), chief judge on the United States District Court for the District of North Dakota and judge on the United States Court of Appeals for the Eighth Circuit
- Jessica Haak, member of the North Dakota House of Representatives
- Loila Hunking, member of the South Dakota House of Representatives
- Donald D. Lorenzen (1920–1980), Los Angeles, California, City Council member, 1969–1977
- George W. Johnson, President of George Mason University (1979–1996)
- John Knauf, justice of the North Dakota Supreme Court (attended but graduated elsewhere)
- Cory Mantyka, Canadian football player
- Barbara McClintock (1976), illustrator and author of children's books
- David Nething, member of the North Dakota State Senate
- Raquel Pa'aluhi, professional Mixed Martial Artist, competed for Invicta FC
- Alvin Plantinga (1950), John A. O'Brien Professor of Philosophy at the University of Notre Dame, author and philosopher
- Jasper Schneider, administrator of the USDA Rural Utilities Service
- Kurt Schork (1969), reporter
- Kyle Schweigert, head football coach at the University of North Dakota
- J. J. Syvrud, American football player

=== Faculty ===
- Larry Woiwode, accomplished author and poet, serving as Poet Laureate of the State of North Dakota since 1995
- William A. Wojnar, classical organist and professor emeritus of Music

== See also ==
- Voorhees Chapel
