= History of Albany, New York (prehistory–1664) =

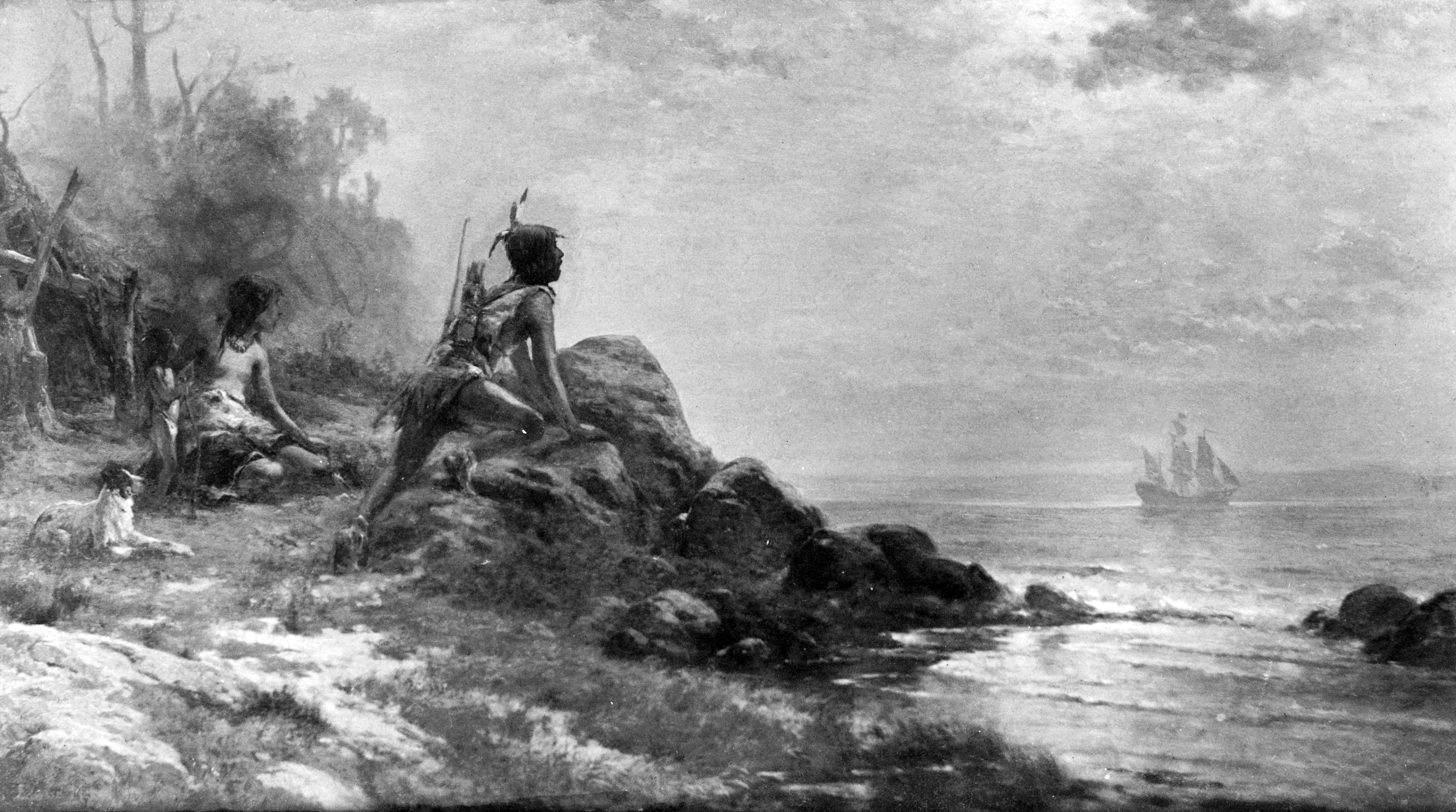
A native looks over New York Harbor to see the arrival of Henry Hudson in 1609.

The history of Albany, New York prior to 1664 begins with the native inhabitants of the area and ends in 1664, with the English takeover of New Netherland. The area was originally inhabited by Algonquian Indian tribes and was given different names by the various peoples. The Mohican called it Pempotowwuthut-Muhhcanneuw, meaning "the fireplace of the Mohican nation", while the Iroquois called it Sche-negh-ta-da, or "through the pine woods". (Note: This name would later be adopted by the city of Schenectady, to the west.) Albany's first European structure was a primitive fort on Castle Island built by French traders in 1540. It was destroyed by flooding soon after construction.

Permanent European claims began when Englishman Henry Hudson, exploring for the Dutch East India Company on the Half Moon (Dutch: Halve Maen), reached the area in 1609, claiming it for the United Netherlands. In 1614, Hendrick Christiaensen rebuilt the French fort as Fort Nassau, the first Dutch fur trading post in present-day Albany. Commencement of the fur trade provoked hostility from the French colony in Canada and amongst the natives, all of whom vied to control the trade. In 1618, a flood ruined the fort on Castle Island, but it was rebuilt in 1624 as Fort Orange. Both forts were named in honor of the royal Dutch House of Orange-Nassau. Fort Orange (New Netherland) and the surrounding area were incorporated as the village of Beverwijck (English: Beaver District) in 1652.

New Netherland was captured by the English in 1664 and the name Beverwijck was changed to Albany, in honor of the Duke of Albany (later James II of England and James VII of Scotland). (Note: James Stuart (1633–1701), brother and successor of Charles II, was both the Duke of York and Duke of Albany before being crowned James II of England and James VII of Scotland in 1685. His title of Duke of York is the source of the name of the province of New York.) Duke of Albany was a Scottish title given since 1398, generally to a younger son of the King of Scots. The name is ultimately derived from Alba, the Gaelic name for Scotland.

== Pre-history and geography ==
Prior to European settlement Albany was a forested location along the Hudson River with five kills (kill being early Dutch for creek, a name still used by Albanians today). These kills carved out steep ravines that separated the hills of Albany from each other. Further inland was the Pine Bush, an inland pine barrens that stretched from Albany to Schenectady. As settlement grew the Pine Bush was gradually cut down further and further inland. The kills, such as the Rutten, Vosen (Foxes), and Beaver kills, were diverted into pipes and covered over. Patroon Creek and the Normans Kill are the two that remain. Some of the ravines were filled in over time. Sheridan Hollow, carved by the now covered Foxen Kill, and Tivoli Hollow, carved by Patroon Creek, are two ravines that are still extant. The Empire State Plaza would in the 1970s fill the hollow created by the already-covered Rutten Kill. Lincoln Park is located in the hollow formed by the now covered Beaver Kill. Washington Park Lake is the result of damming up the only remaining part of the Rutten Kill that is above ground.

The native inhabitants of Albany at the time of the arrival of the Dutch called the Normans Kill the Tawawsantha. The area of Albany had been given different names by the various native tribes of the area. The Mohegans called it Pem-po-tu-wuth-ut, which means "place of the council fire", and the Iroquois called it Sche-negh-ta-da, meaning "through the pine woods". The five kills were initially called First Kill, Second Kill, and so on. Normans Kill received its name from Albert Bradt, a Norwegian (Dutch: Noorman) and one of the earliest settlers, and the Rutten Kill was named for Rutgers Bleecker, an early land owner along its banks.

== Initial European settlement ==
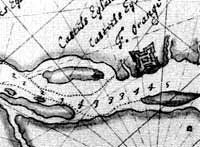
Map of Castle Island and Fort Orange in 1629

Albany is the oldest surviving European settlement from the original Thirteen Colonies. In 1540 French traders became the first Europeans to visit the area of the present-day city and built a primitive fort on Castle Island. This fort was built on a flood plain and was soon abandoned as a result of damage due to the annual freshet (flooding associated with spring thaw). Permanent European claims began when Englishman Henry Hudson, exploring for the Dutch East India Company on his ship the Halve Maen ("Half Moon"), reached the area in 1609. In 1614, the Dutch explorer Hendrick Christiaensen rebuilt the earlier French fort (referred to as a French chateau at the time) as Fort Nassau, the first Dutch fur trading post in the area. Upon Christiaensen's death Jacob Eelkens took charge of the fort.

Commencement of the fur trade provoked hostility from the French colony in Canada and amongst the native tribes, who vied for control. The fort was again abandoned due to the freshet and a replacement was built in 1624 as Fort Orange, slightly to the north. Both forts were named in honor of the Dutch House of Orange-Nassau.

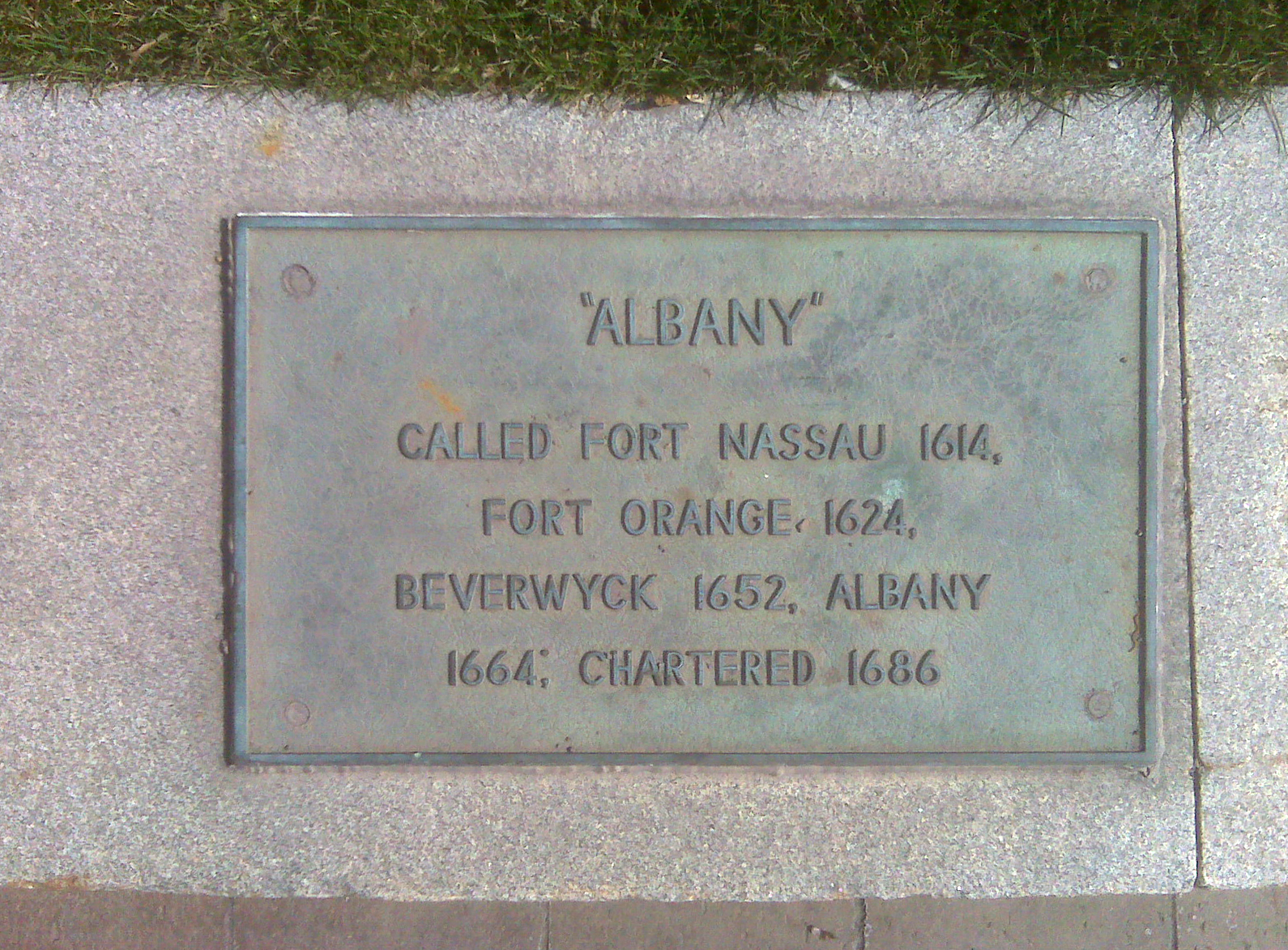
Historical Marker - Broadway at foot of State Street

In 1626 the Mohawk nation to the west of Albany and the Mohegan nation from the east bank of the Hudson River renewed their ongoing tribal conflict. The fledgling Fort Orange sided with the Mohegans and as a result lost six soldiers in an ambush in what is now Lincoln Park on Delaware Avenue. In 1628 the Mohawks defeated the Mohegans and pushed them to Connecticut. In 1642 a ferry was established to the east bank of the Hudson, at the native settlement of Tuscameatic. The Dutch would later call this site Het Green Bosch ("the Green Woods"). This site is now the city of Rensselaer but the name lives on in the towns of North Greenbush and East Greenbush.

The Director-General of New Amsterdam, Pieter Stuyvesant, came to Fort Orange in April 1652 and incorporated the areas surrounding the fort as Dorpe Beverwyck (the Village of Beverwyck). He established the first court at Albany around the same time. A court was needed to try a dispute between Stuyvesant and the patroonship of Rensselaerswyck over jurisdiction of the land surrounding the fort.

== Bibliography ==
- Brodhead, John Romeyn (1874). History of the State of New York. New York City: Harper & Brothers, Publishers. OCLC 458890237 – via Google Books.
- Chisholm, Hugh, ed. (1911). "Albany (New York)" . Encyclopædia Britannica. Vol. 01 (11th ed.). Cambridge University Press. pp. 489–491.
- Howell, George Rogers; Jonathan Tenney (1886). Bi-centennial History of Albany: History of the County of Albany, N.Y. from 1609 to 1886 (Volume II). New York City: W. W. Munsell & Co. OCLC 11543538 – via Google Books.
- McEneny, John (2006). Albany, Capital City on the Hudson: An Illustrated History. Sun Valley, California: American Historical Press. ISBN 1-892724-53-7.
- Reynolds, Cuyler (1906). Albany Chronicles: A History of the City Arranged Chronologically, From the Earliest Settlement to the Present Time. Albany: J. B. Lyon Company. OCLC 457804870 – via Google Books.
- Rittner, Don (2002). Then & Now: Albany. Charleston, South Carolina: Arcadia Publishing. ISBN 0-7385-1142-0.
- Venema, Janny (2003). Beverwijck: A Dutch Village on the American Frontier, 1652–1664. Hilversum: Verloren. ISBN 0-7914-6079-7.
