= Benedict Arnold (disambiguation) =

Benedict Arnold (1741–1801) was an American Revolution general who defected from the American to the British side.

Benedict Arnold may also refer to:

- A metaphor for a traitor or a person who betrays an alliance
- Benedict Arnold (New York politician) (1780–1849), American politician from New York
- Benedict Arnold (governor) (1615–1678), early governor of the Rhode Island colony and great grandfather of General Benedict Arnold

== See also ==
- Ben Arnold (disambiguation)
- Benjamin Arnold (disambiguation)
- Arnold (surname)
