= Benjamin Arnold =

Benjamin Arnold may refer to:

- Benjamin Lee Arnold (1839–1892), American academic and university president
- Benjamin W. Arnold (1865–1932), American lumber businessman from New York
- Benjamin Green Arnold, founding president of the Coffee Exchange in the 1880s.

== See also ==
- Ben Arnold (disambiguation)
- Benjamin Walworth Arnold House and Carriage House
