= Washington Park Historic District (Albany, New York) =

Historic district in New York, United States

- U.S. National Register of Historic Places
- U.S. Historic district
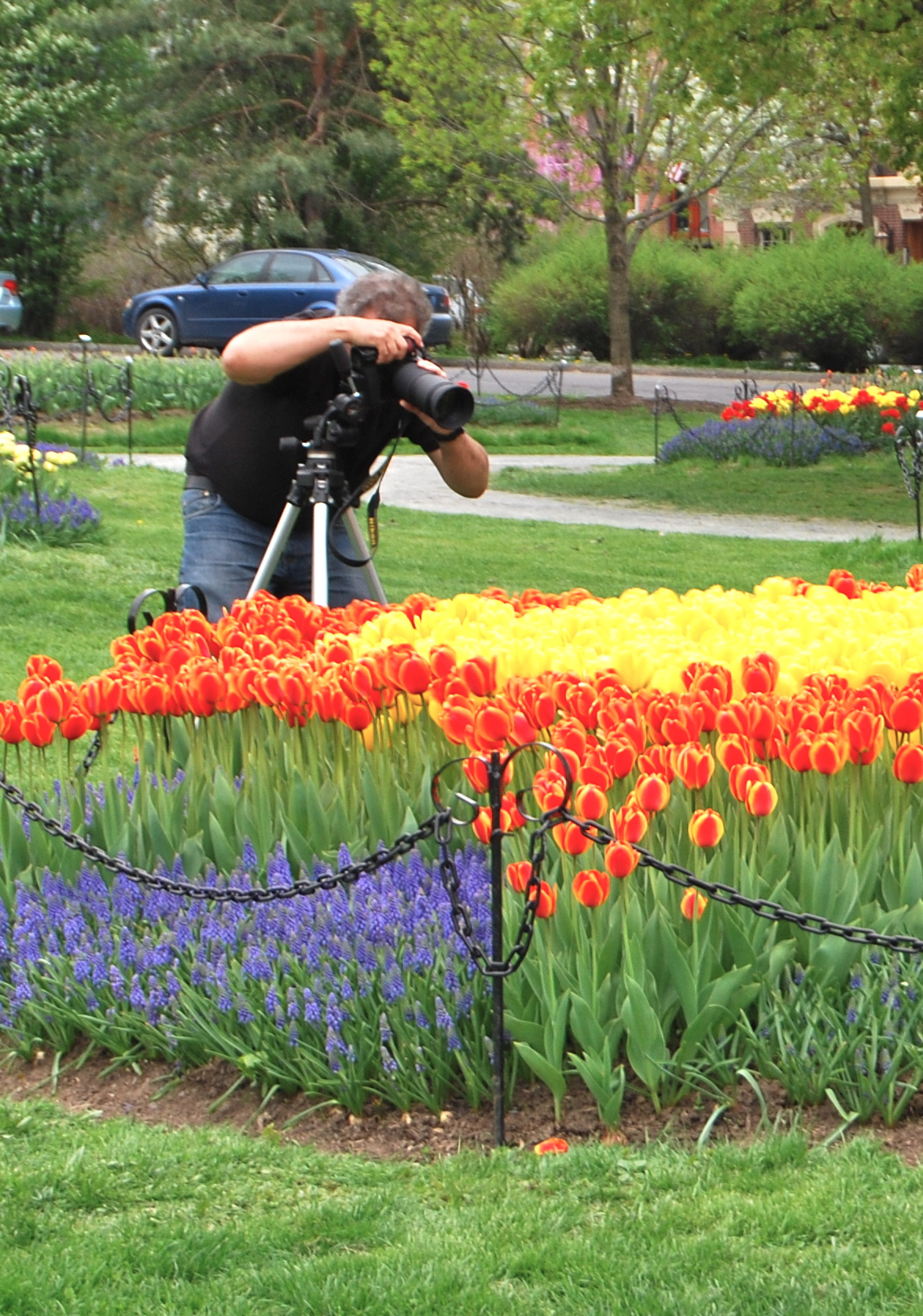
- A photographer at Tulip Fest

- Location within New York Location within the United States
- Location: Washington Park and surrounding properties, Albany, New York
- Coordinates: 42°39′25″N 73°46′18″W
- Area: 136 acres (0.55 km^{2})
- Architect: John Bogart and John Cuyler (for park) multiple for residences including HH Richardson and Stanford White
- NRHP reference No.: 72000818
- Added to NRHP: June 19, 1972

Washington Park in Albany, New York is the city's premier park and the site of many festivals and gatherings. As public property it dates back to the city charter in 1686, and has seen many uses including that of gunpowder storage, square/parade grounds, and cemetery. The park is often mistaken as being designed by Frederick Law Olmsted, as it incorporates many of the philosophical ideals used by Olmsted when he designed Central Park in Manhattan. The park is about 81 acres (33 ha) in size with the 5.2-acre (2.1 ha) Washington Park Lake, a roughly 1,600-foot-long (490 m) and 140-foot-wide (43 m) lake, in the southwestern corner.

Not only is the park historic, but so is the mostly residential surrounding neighborhood. Many architectural works line the streets facing the park, designed by some of the most famous architects of the late 19th century, including Henry Hobson Richardson. At least two governors of New York lived in buildings facing Washington Park outside of their term in office. Due to the historical and architectural significance of the park and neighborhood both were included in 1972 as the Washington Park Historic District; and in 1998 the park was named one of the nation's 100 most important parks by the American Association of Architects. In 2008 Boston-based composer Peter Child wrote an orchestral piece inspired by the park, entitled Washington Park.

== History ==
=== Cemetery and parade grounds ===
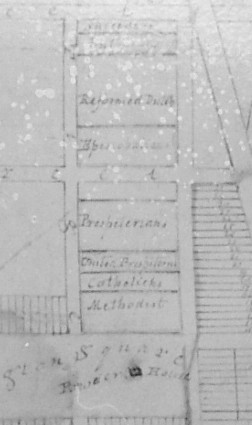
Cemetery along State Street in 1809. North to top-right.

Washington Park has been public property since the Dongan Charter was granted to Albany incorporating it as a city. The charter specified that all land not privately owned at the time became property of the Mayor, Aldermen, and Commonalty of the city of Albany, including the land that would become the site of Washington Park. A portion of the land was set aside for a structure built to house gunpowder in 1802, and in 1806 the areas between Willett and Knox streets, and between State Street and Madison Avenue, became the Middle Public Square. In 1800, the land west of Knox Street to Robin Street and south from State Street to Hudson Avenue was taken for a cemetery, which was apportioned into sections for each of Albany's churches. There were separate sections for African Americans and for strangers. West of the cemetery was the alms-house farm and the penitentiary grounds. In 1809 the Middle Public Square was renamed Washington Square, and later the Washington Parade Ground. In 1868 the remains and headstones in the cemetery were removed and reinterred, most to Albany Rural Cemetery, and some to the cemeteries of other churches.

For years leading up to the creation of the park, the leading citizens and newspapers in Albany had pushed for a grand public park. Frederick Law Olmsted's Olmsted, Vaux and Company was hired in 1869 to plan such a park. In their plan they envisioned Washington Park as the centerpiece of a string of parks and boulevards similar to those they had designed in Buffalo, Boston, and Brooklyn. Though Olmsted and his company was not involved in the actual design of the park, their broad vision was followed for the detailed designs, including the idea of damming the Beaver Kill (Beaver Creek) to form a grand lake.

=== Construction of the park ===
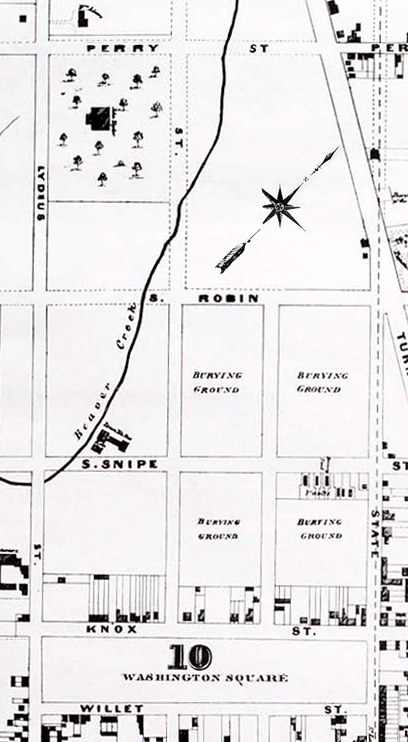
Area of Washington Park in 1857; north is to the top-right.

The New York Legislature passed a law in 1869 authorizing the creation of a large public park on the spot and the creation of the Board of Trustees of the Washington Park of the City of Albany (later Commissioners). John Bogart and John Cuyler drew the plans for Washington Park in 1870. Bogart had worked for Olmsted and Vaux on Central Park in New York and later Bogart was the chief engineer for the New York City Department of Parks from 1872 to 1877. From 1869 to 1872 R.H. Bingham was the chief engineer in charge of the drafting of the plans and the supervision of construction, after 1872 his assistant William S. Egerton took charge. It was under Egerton that the formal garden settings were planted.

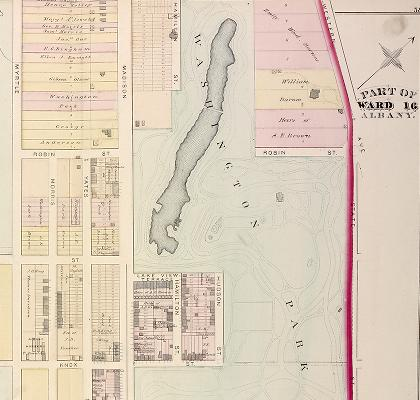
Map of Washington Park in 1876; north is to the top-right.

Work on the Washington Parade Grounds between Willett and Knox streets was begun in July 1870 and finished by the end of the year. During 1871 the former cemetery was landscaped and that area reopened as part of the park. The section of Washington Park between Lexington (formerly Snipe) and Robin streets was the focus of work in 1873, including the damming of the Beaverkill to form Washington Park Lake. In 1874 focus shifted to roughly 15 acres (61,000 m^{2}) along Madison Avenue from Lake to Robin and a footbridge was built over the lake in 1875. Nine acres of mostly row houses along Knox Street north of Madison were purchased, destroyed, and landscaped in 1880; this included the area that would be the site of the King Memorial Fountain. The large house and landscaped grounds of John Taylor was the last part of the park to be purchased, in 1882, since 1889 it has been the site of tennis courts. The northwestern corner that is cut out of the park's otherwise rectangular shape was never part of the park; those plots were mostly owned by the Barnes family and developed into urban mansions facing Thurlow Terrace and Englewood Place. The process of buying and improving the land piecemeal was criticized because each improvement raised the value of the existing land that still needed to be purchased. The increase in property value can be shown through the value of the lands surrounding Washington Park almost doubling in the six years in which the majority of the park improvements were made; from $2,696,688 in 1869 to $4,843,440 in 1875. The properties next to Washington Park on Robin Street, which was renamed Englewood Terrace, increased in value from $9,500 in 1875 to $175,800 by 1891.

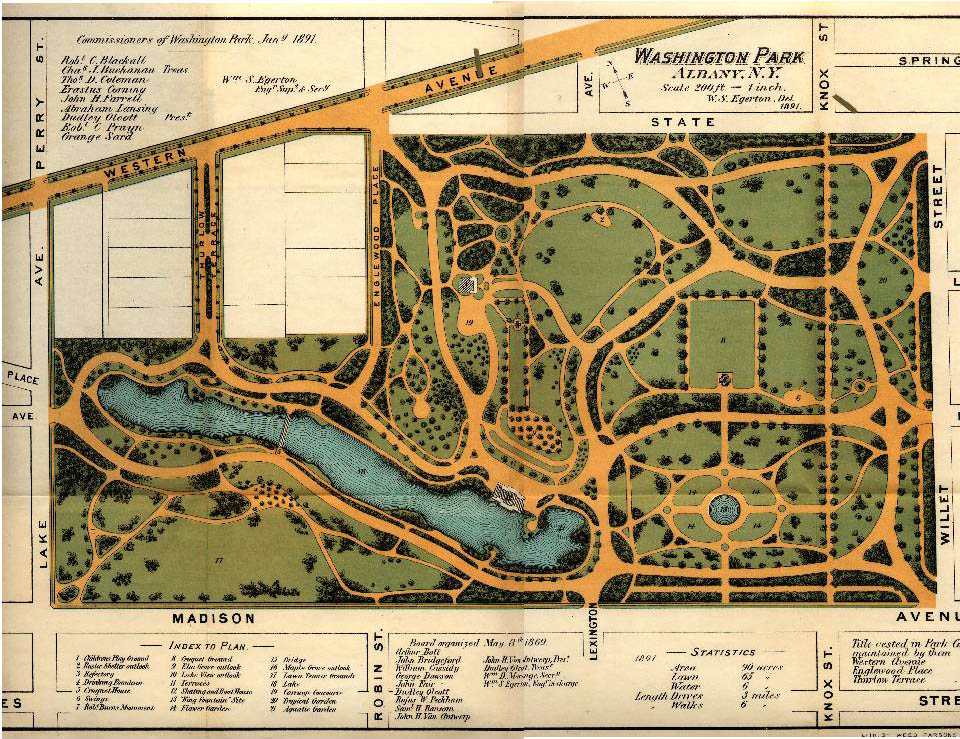
Design of Washington Park as originally constructed

The Commissioners, including John G. Farnsworth, were given by the state additional powers to build and maintain approaches to the park and other parks as well, this allowed the commissioners to build a series of boulevards around the city. Western Avenue from the northwestern corner of Washington Park to the location of the toll gate of the Western Turnpike was under the purview of the commissioners. Work on the road began in late 1876 and was finished the next year. The total construction cost of the park, including purchasing the real estate and improving Western Avenue, was $1,073,020.91. In 1878 Northern Boulevard (today Manning Boulevard) was constructed by the commissioners, it extended from the western end of their jurisdiction on Western Avenue north and east to the intersection of Clinton and Central avenues. In 1896 the state legislature also gave the commissioners authority over Lake Avenue from the park corner at Madison Avenue south to New Scotland Avenue (then- Albany, Schoharie, and Rensselaerville Plank Road). In addition to boulevards the Commissioners of Washington Park also gained control of other existing parks, and built new ones throughout the city, including Academy Park, Bleeker Park, Hudson Avenue Park, Clinton Square, Rensselaer Park, St. Joseph's Park, Townsend Park, Beaver Park (later Lincoln Park), and the former grounds of the Dudley Observatory. In 1900 the board of commissioners was transformed into the Bureau of Parks in the Department of Public Works and later the bureau became a separate department.

=== Modern times ===
In 1958 Lancaster Street, which had previously ended at Willett Street opposite the park, was extended through to Northern Boulevard (today Henry Johnson Boulevard). Associated with this extension Northern Boulevard was also widened and both Lancaster and State streets were turned into one-ways. Entrances to Washington Park from Thurlow Terrace and Englewood Place were closed in 1972 turning those into dead end streets from Western Avenue. In 1988 Washington Park Road was renamed Albany Plan of Union Avenue in honor of the colonial congress held in Albany by Benjamin Franklin that proposed closer ties and support among the Thirteen Colonies. In 1991 Northern Boulevard from its intersection with Madison Avenue and Willett Street north through the park and continuing to Livingston Avenue in Arbor Hill was renamed Henry Johnson Boulevard in honor of African-American World War I hero Henry Johnson.

In the 1950s Dutch elm disease (Ceratocystis ulmi) killed all the elms that once populated the park and crab apples were planted to replace the elms along the pedestrian mall. After deteriorating over the decades Washington Park saw a revival in the 1990s and 2000s with the flower beds being restored to their original specifications, the pedestrian mall removed of pavement and widened to its original dimensions with disease-resistant elms planted to form a canopy, the King Fountain relit at night, and the lilac shrub border around the periphery of the park being restored.

== Structures ==
Washington Park Lakehouses

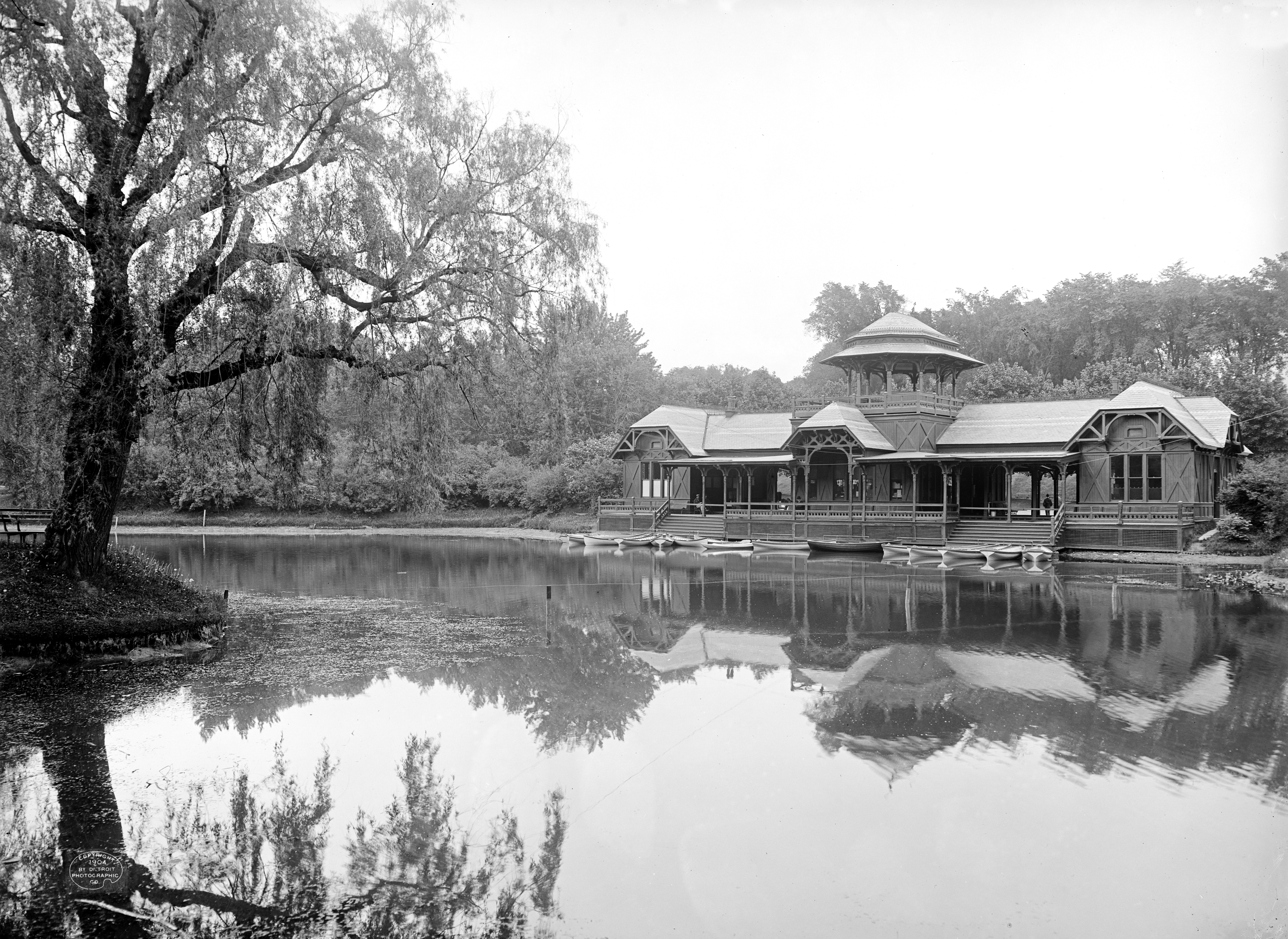
Original lake house, 1904

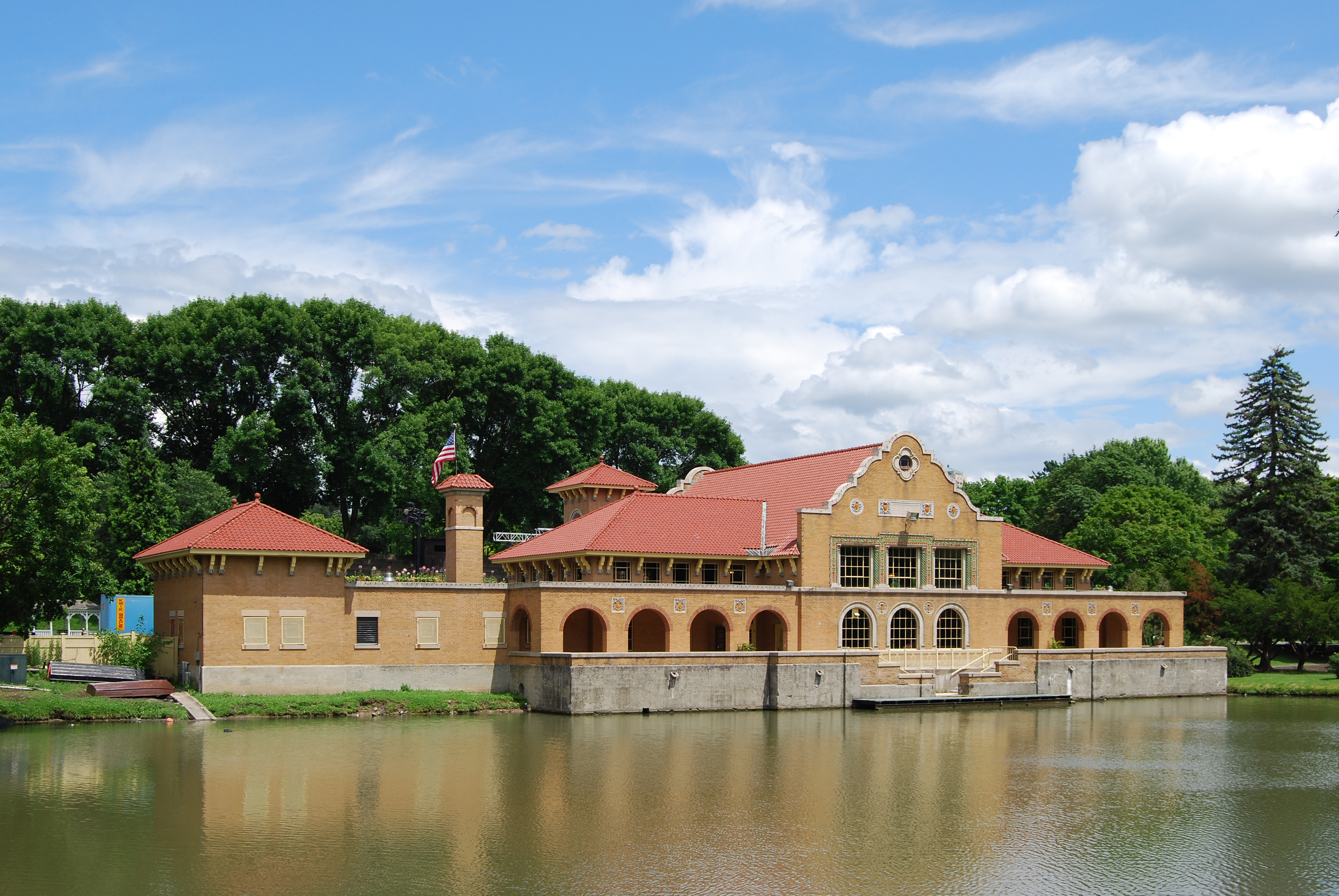
Current lake house

Originally, Washington Park included many buildings: several shelters of untrimmed logs, a pavilion, wellhouse, croquet shelter, and lakehouse once dotted the landscape. The wooden lake house was replaced in 1929 with a "modern" brick structure while the others over time succumbed to age and changing use-patterns for the park and no longer stand. The footbridge over Washington Park Lake, erected in 1875, is the only remaining original structure in Washington Park. The lamps on the bridge were originally gas lamps, but they were electrified in 1881.

The current Washington Park Lake House was built in 1929 replacing the original stick style structure constructed in 1876. It is constructed in the Spanish Revival style with terracotta, terrazzo, brick, and guastavino tile. The area in front of the lake house has been the site for the performance of plays by the Park Playhouse for over 20 years. A 900-seat amphitheater faces the lake house allowing for comfortable seating for the over 60,000 people who visit every year. A proposal by the city to turn the lake house into a 125-seat restaurant and 200-seat banquet hall with an expanded dock with boat, cross-country ski, and ice skate rentals failed to materialize due to a lack of interest from the private business sector.

== Monuments ==
Washington Park Monuments

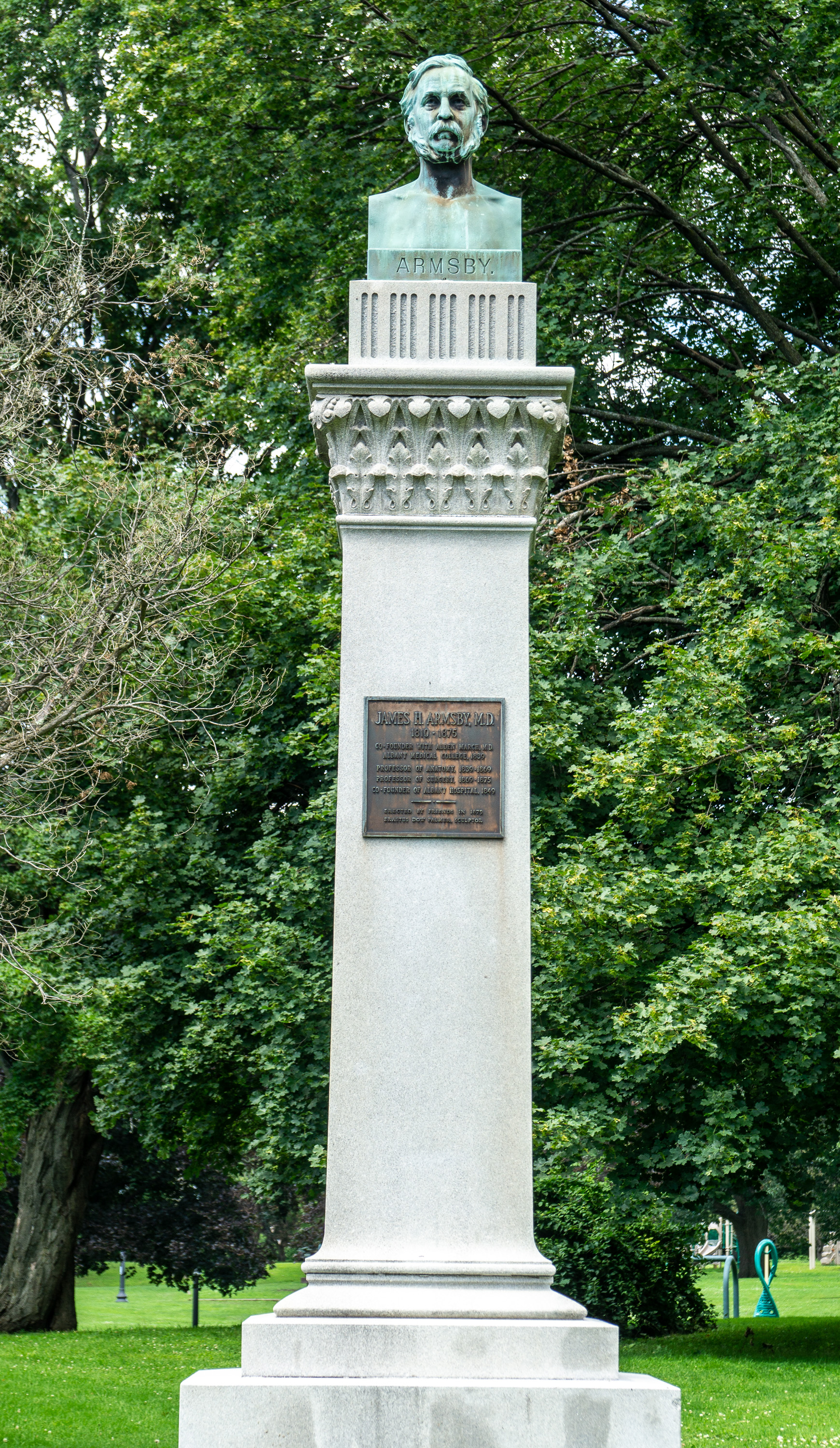
James H. Armsby Memorial

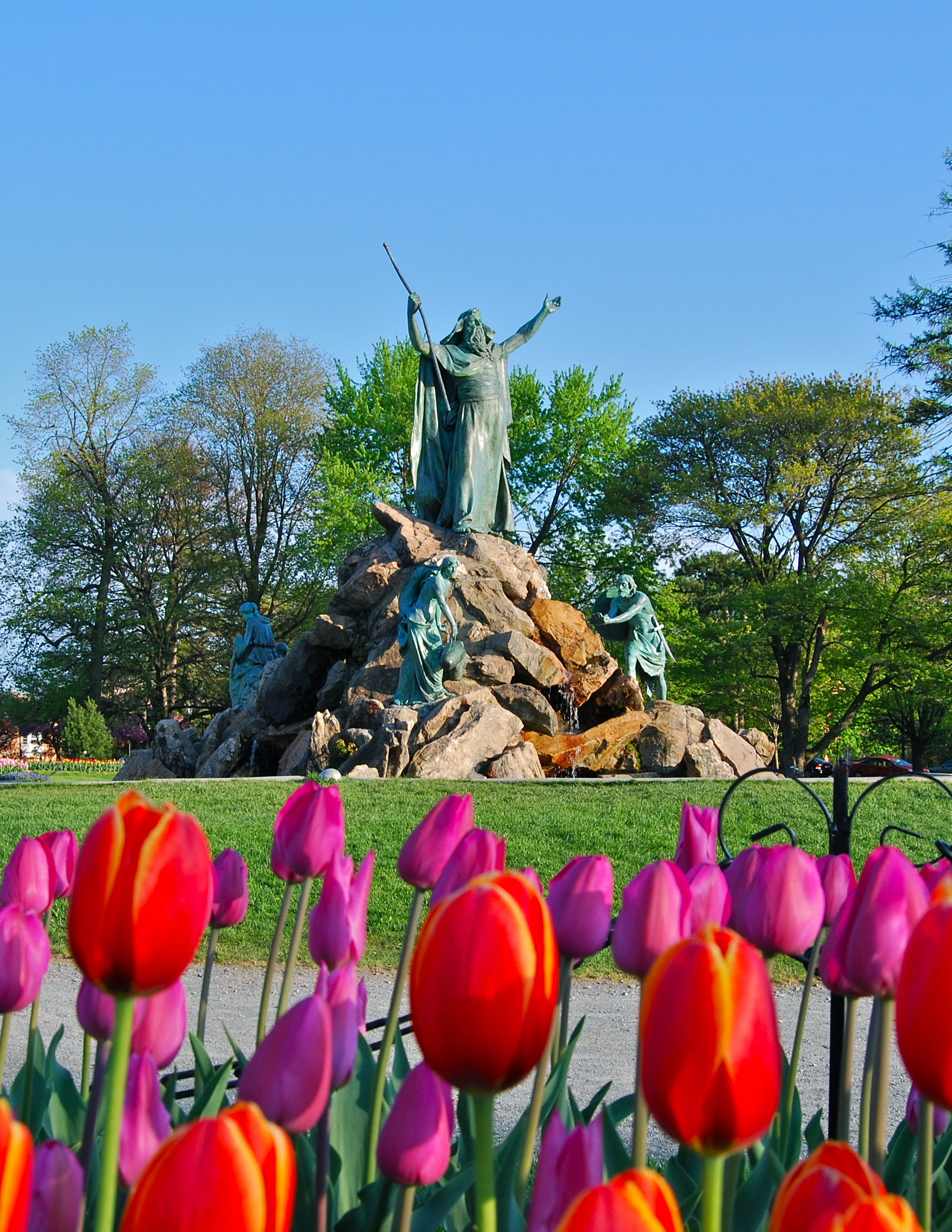
King Memorial Fountain

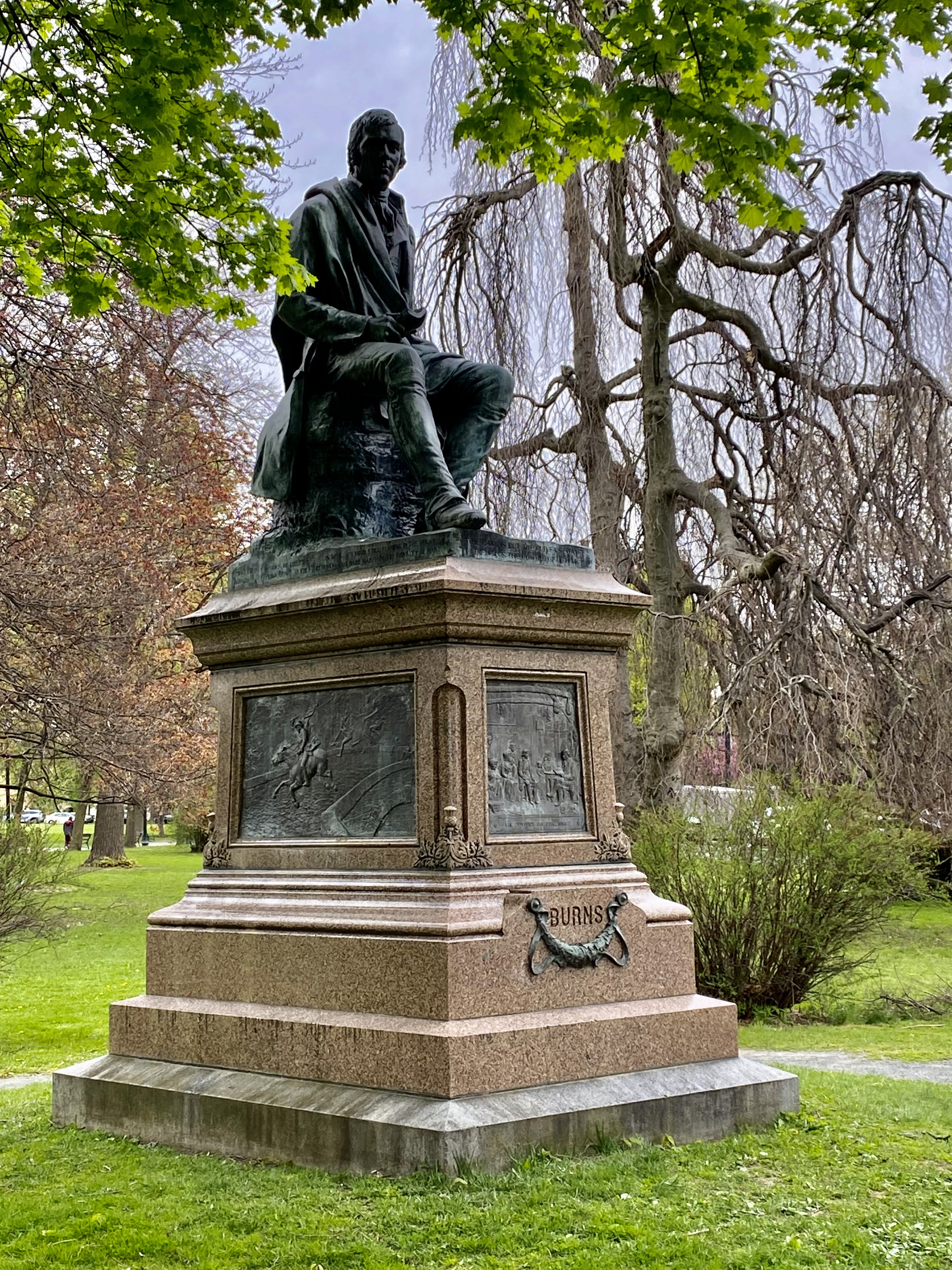
Robert Burns Statue

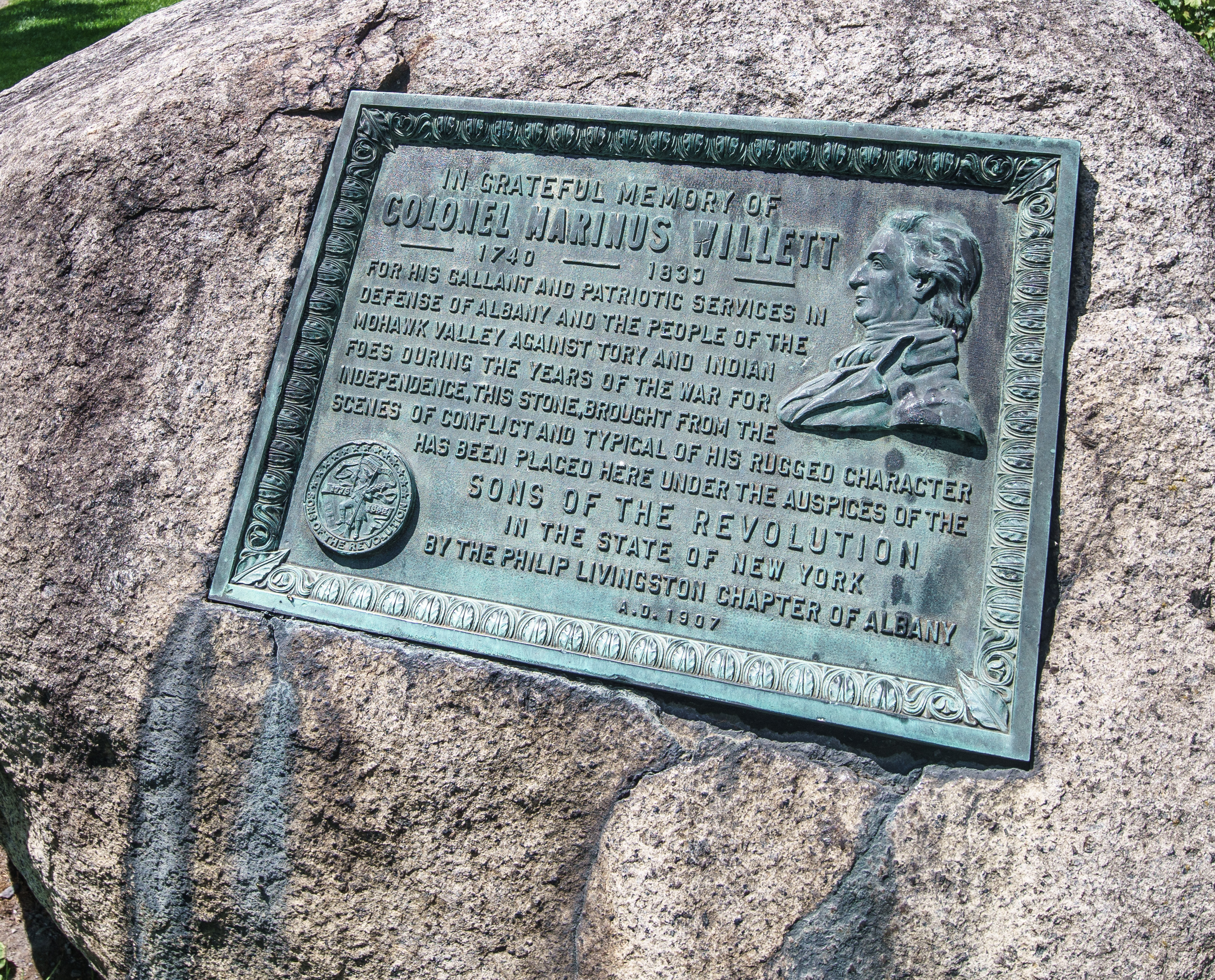
Marinus Willett Memorial

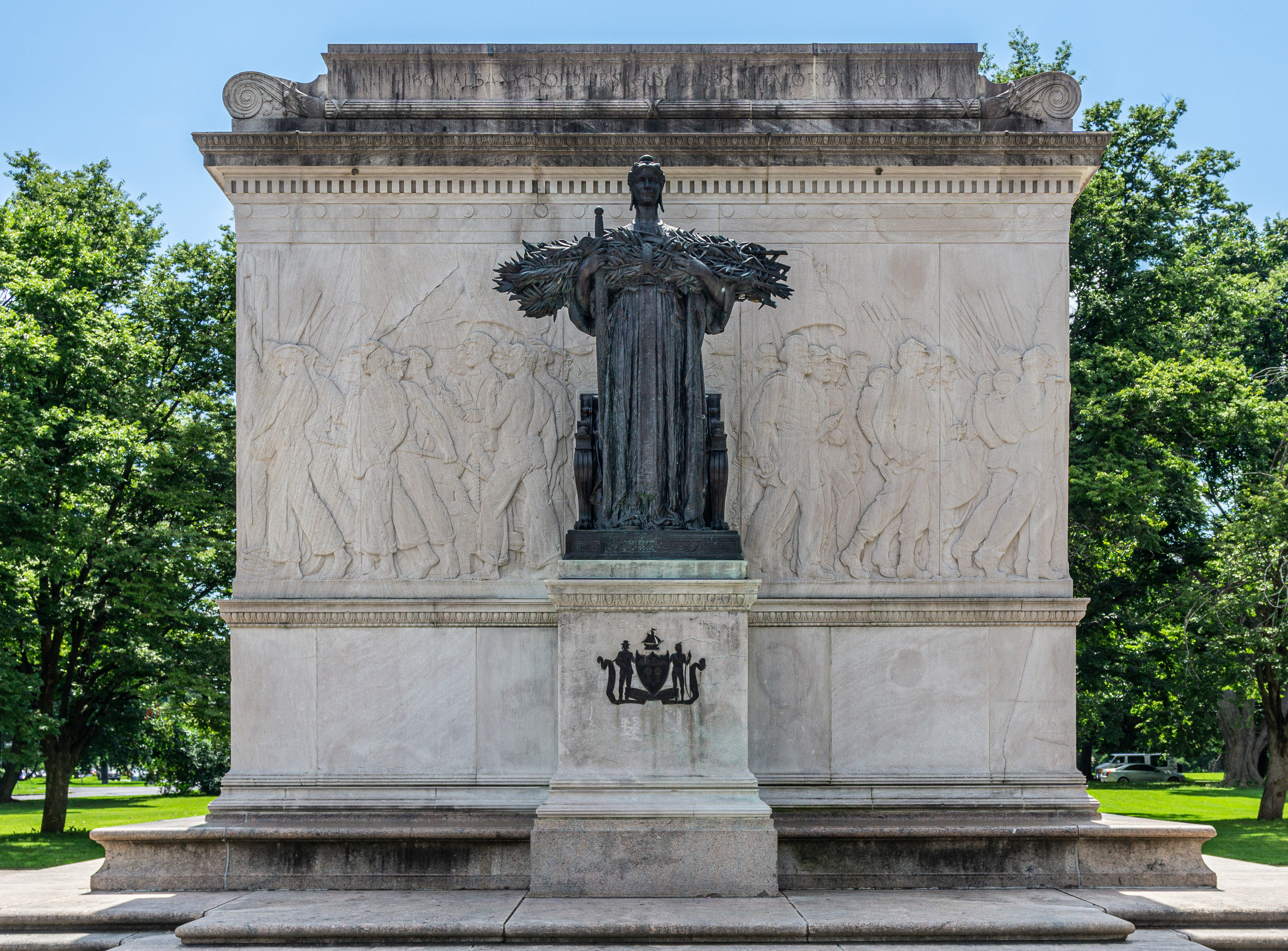
Soldiers and Sailors' Monument, NE side

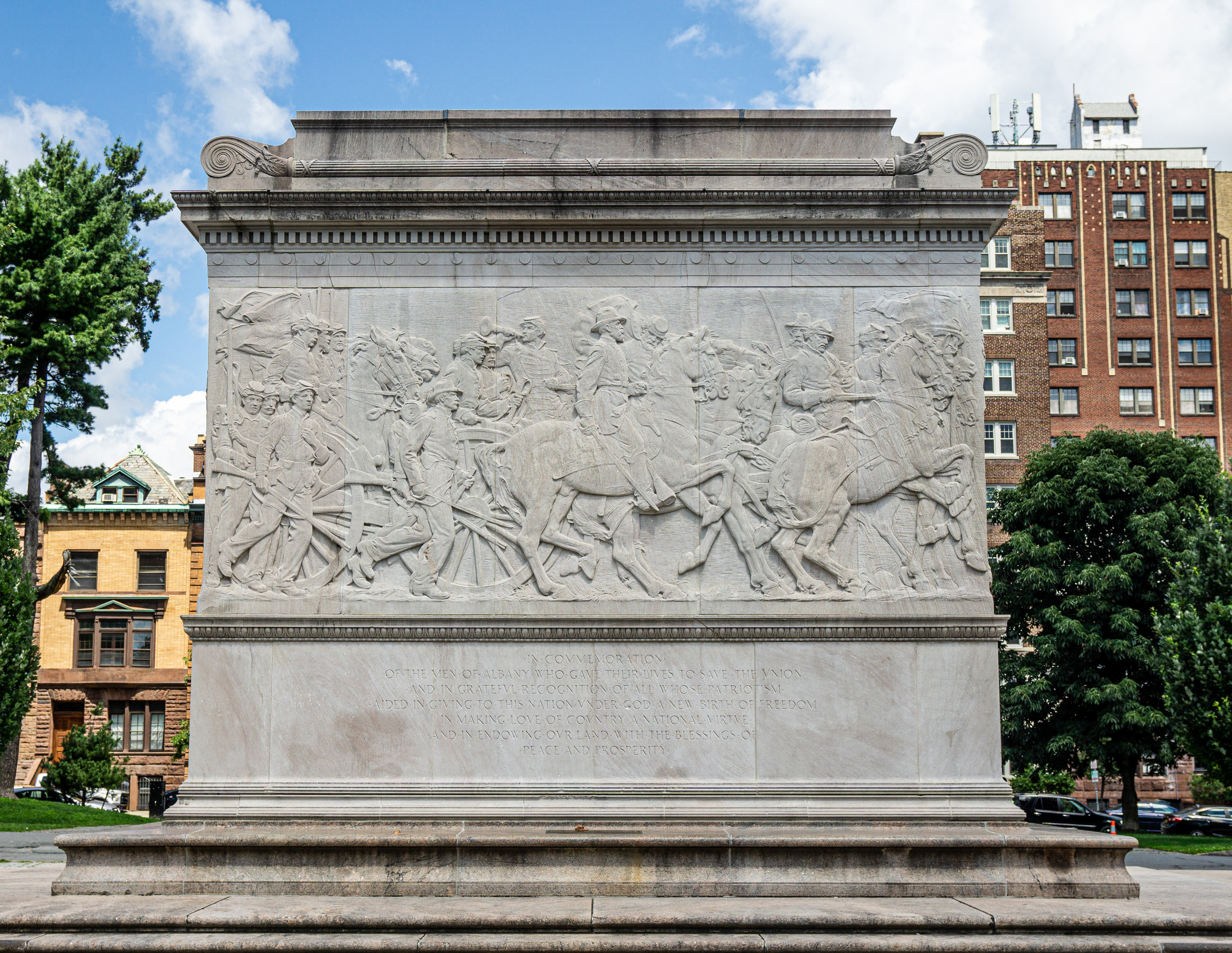
Soldiers and Sailors' Monument, SW side

- Dr. James H. Armsby Memorial is a bust of James H. Armsby, the co-founder of Albany Medical College. Erected in 1879, it was the first memorial in the park.
- Robert Burns Statue is a bronze statue erected in 1888, with four panels around the base installed in 1891. It is of the famous Scottish poet Robert Burns, his statue was sculpted by Charles Calverley and each of the four panels around the base have one of Burns' poems carved by George H. Boughton. The Saint Andrew's Society funded conservation of the statue in 1978.
- King Memorial Fountain is a fountain erected in 1893 with a monumental bronze statue of Moses smiting the rock for water on Mount Horeb. Four figures of Israelite slaves around the statue on the side of the mountain represent the four stages of life: infancy, youth, adulthood, and old age. The fountain is in the center of formal gardens laid out by William S. Egerton. It was a gift from Rufus H. King and was sculpted by J. Massey Rhind, who also sculpted the Philip Schuyler statue that stands at the center of the intersection of Eagle Street and Washington Avenue in front of city hall. In 1988, the statue of Moses was cleaned and applied with a wax coating to protect it from the weather, and an arm was reattached to one of the four other statues on the fountain.
- Marinus Willett Memorial is a monument to Colonel Marinus Willett commemorating his combat and character during the French and Indian Wars. It consists of a 33,000-pound (15,000 kg) boulder from the "scenes of conflict" he fought in, and the plaque is dedicated to his "patriotic services in defense of Albany and the people of the Mohawk". The boulder was placed by the Sons of the American Revolution in 1907, facing towards an entrance to the park from the corner of State and Willett streets, an entrance that no longer exists. The boulder's back faced Henry Johnson Boulevard (formerly Northern Boulevard) and was the scene of many vehicular accidents as drivers missed a sharp curve. In 2006, as part of the 200th anniversary of the park, the boulder was moved 60 yards (55 m) to the corner of State and Willett.
- Soldiers and Sailors' Monument is a marble monument sitting on a granite base with a bronze statue representing the Nation, holding the palms of victory. The monument is built of Tennessee marble above the seat and the remainder is of Stony Creek granite. It is 22 feet (6.7 m) high, 21 feet (6.4 m) long and 5.5 feet (1.7 m) deep, surrounded by a seat, the whole resting upon a platform 70 feet (21 m) long by 64 feet (20 m) deep. It sits at the Henry Johnson Boulevard entrance from State Street to the park. The monument represents "The Nation at Peace Won Through Victorious War". It was finished in 1911 by American Sculptor Hermon A. MacNeil and erected in 1912 by the Grand Army of the Republic as a monument to Civil War veterans. The monument was restored in 1986 and renamed the Albany Veterans Memorial Monument with an unveiling by two 85-year-old women who, as 12-year-olds, had unveiled the monument when it was first erected in 1912.
- Henry Johnson Memorial is a bust of World War I hero Henry Johnson in a traffic island at the intersection of Henry Johnson Boulevard and Willett Street near Madison Avenue, erected in 1991.

== Activities ==
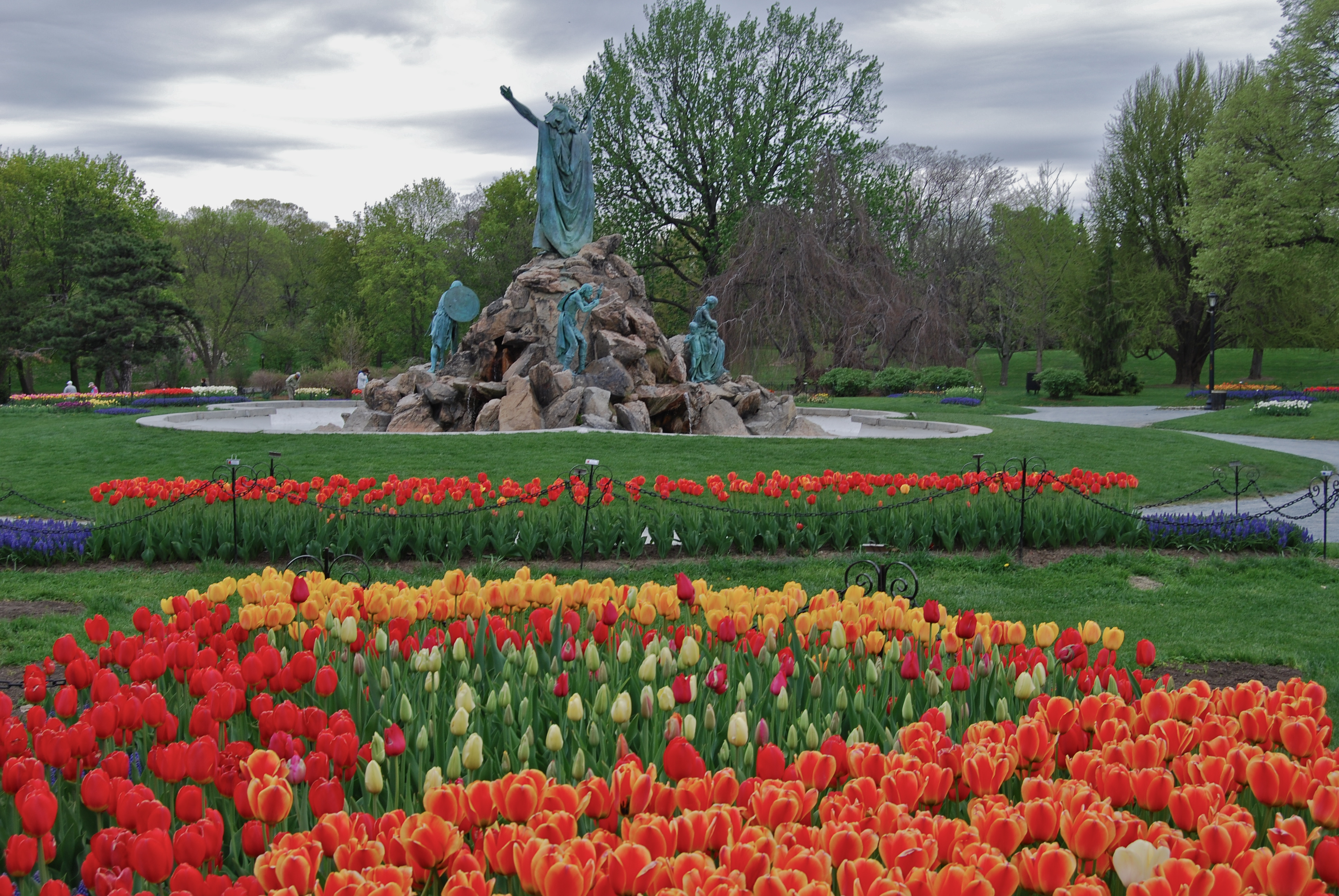
Tulips during TulipFest behind King Fountain

Washington Park has many activities open to visitors and residents, some maintained by the city, others are spontaneously set up by individuals. Washington Park's open spaces are often used by visitors to play boccie, volleyball, and badminton games. Tennis, basketball, and handball courts are maintained by the city in the park, and ice skating is permitted on Washington Park Lake, though swimming is prohibited. Bicycling is popular on the many roadways, many of which are closed to vehicular traffic. Though skateboarding is legal throughout the park itself, the monuments and ball courts in the park fall under a citywide ban on skateboarding on public monuments, statues, and tennis/basketball courts.

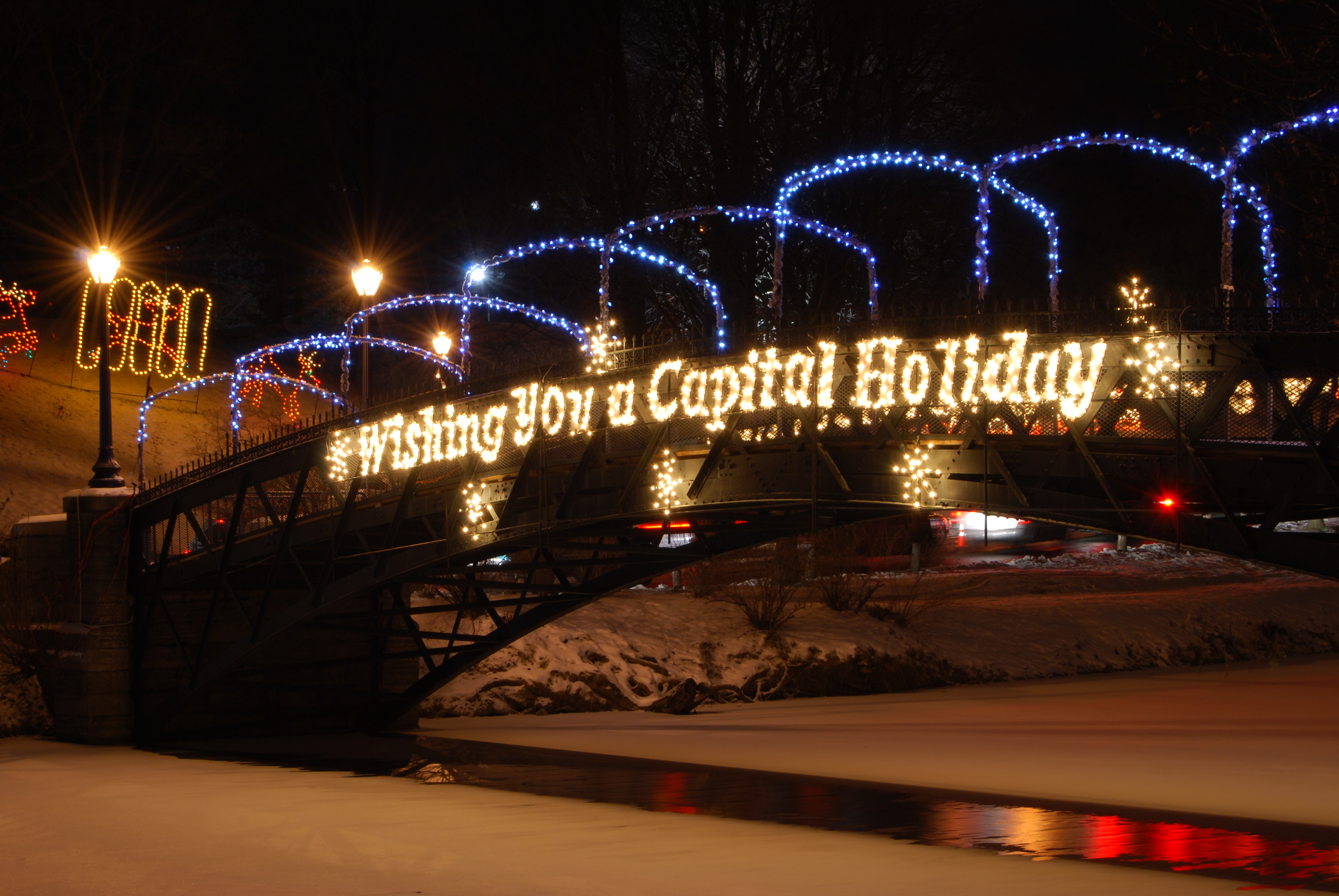
Bridge during Capital Holiday Lights

Washington Park is the site of many festivals, concerts, and special occasions. The Tulip Festival held every year since 1949 in Washington Park is highlighted by the blossoming of 200,000 tulips throughout the park. The African-American tradition of Pinksterfest, whose origins are traced back even further to Dutch festivities, was later incorporated into the Tulip Fest and since 1998 the Tulip Fest has also included the Mother of the Year award. The Latin Festival and the Columbus Day Parade and Italian Festival are some of the ethnic festivals held every year in the park. The Capital Pride Festival also takes place in the park every year in June. The city, the Albany Police Athletic League, and Hannaford supermarkets sponsor the Capital Holiday Lights every winter, with 125 displays through the park. Proceeds benefit juvenile crime prevention programs.

Many fund raisers are held every year in the park as well, such as the American Cancer Society walkathon and the Freihofer's Run for Women. The Freihofer's Run is an International Association of Athletics Federations (IAAF) Silver Label race that draws professional marathon runners from Kenya, Ethiopia, Australia, and all across the United States along with locals as well. It is one of the largest all-women races in the world, and has served as the 5K national championship in 1989, 1990, and 1993–2004.

== Historic district ==
The streets surrounding Washington Park, State Street to the north, Willett Avenue to the east, Madison Avenue to the south, and South Lake Avenue to the west, along with Englewood Terrace, Thurlow Terrace, and the residence at 76 Western Avenue to the northwest, are all included in the Washington Park Historic District. Most of the existing properties date to after the 1880s, with very few predating the creation of the park.

=== State Street ===
Architecture on State Street

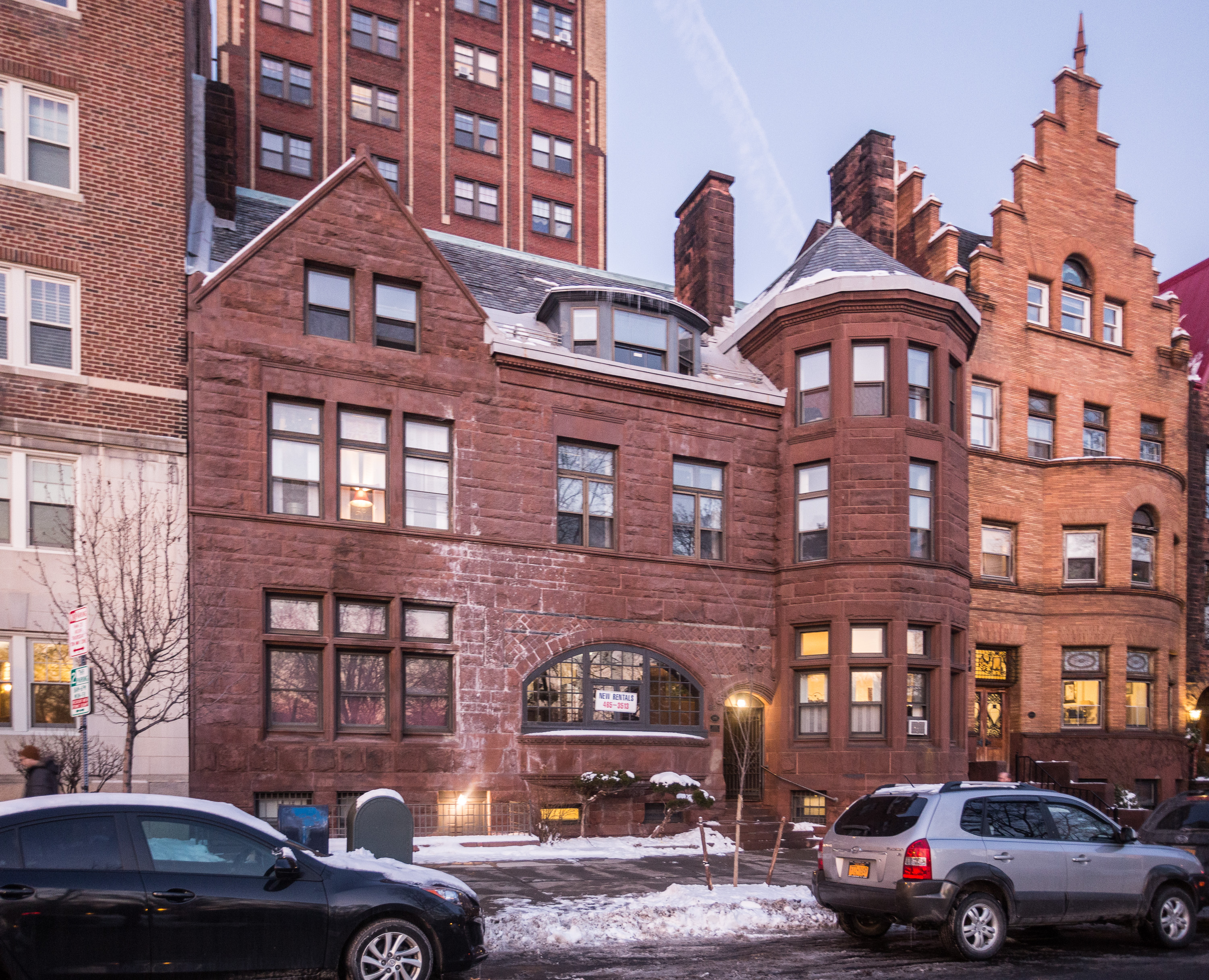
Grange Sard Jr. House, H.H. Richardson (1882)

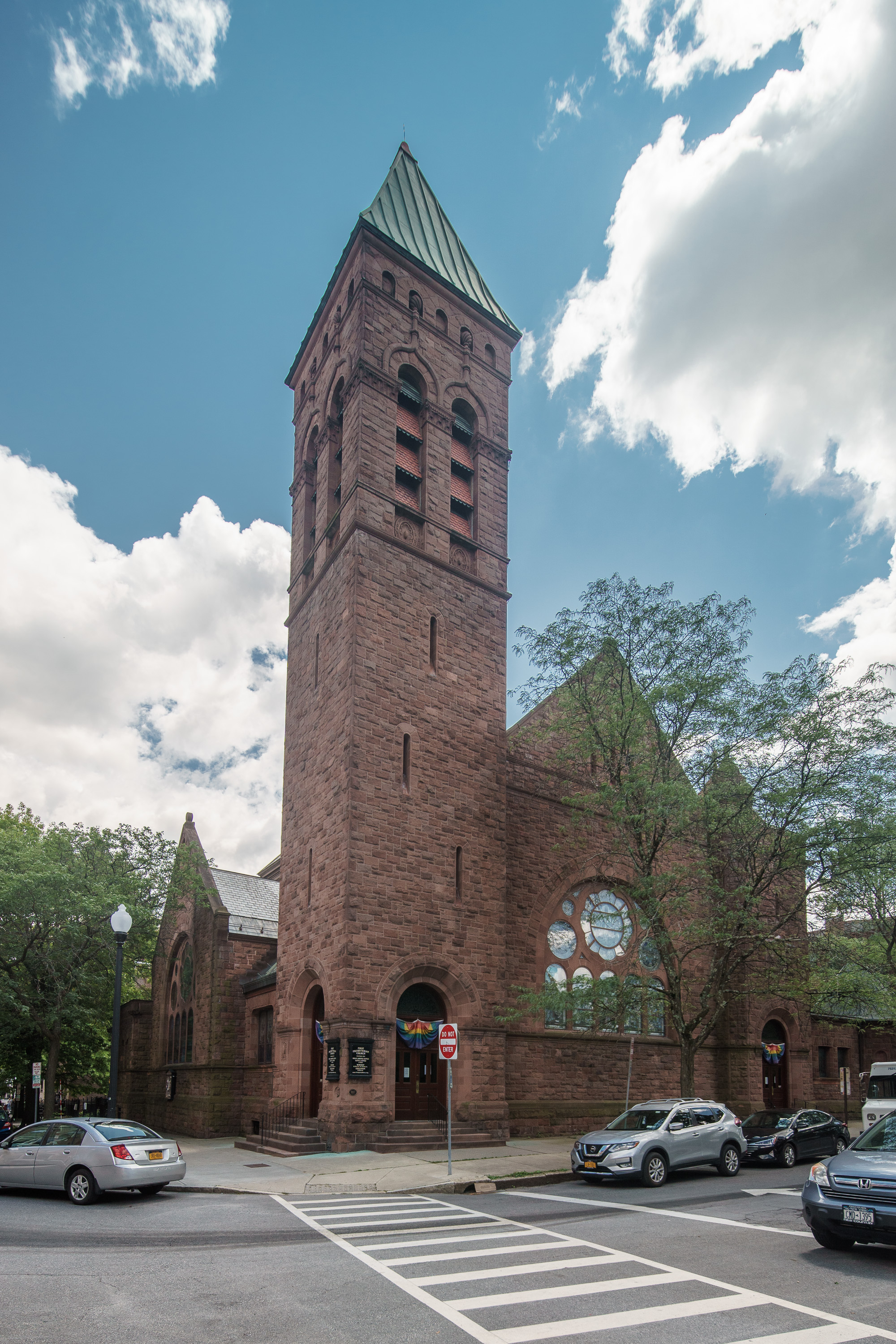
First Presbyterian Church, J. Cleaveland Cady (1882)

State Street is a one-way eastbound street along Washington Park's northern border. Over 60 townhouses sit on State Street facing the park; most are of brick or brownstone and three stories tall. Many of these homes were built for industrialists, bankers, railroad executives, and politicians by notable national architects such as Henry Hobson Richardson and Stanford White, and local ones such as Marcus T. Reynolds and Albert Fuller. Many of the buildings have fine details such as decorative tiles, terracotta, or stone. On the corner of State and Willett is located the First Presbyterian Church, designed by J. Cleaveland Cady in 1882, and the church is noted for its four Tiffany windows. New York Governor John Alden Dix lived at 491 State Street before and after his term in office. 423 State Street is owned by the University at Albany and used by its Center for Legislative Development. At 465 State Street is the Benjamin Walworth Arnold House and Carriage House, the only buildings in Albany designed by Stanford White.

=== Willett Street ===
Willet Street is a northbound one-way street comprising three blocks, stretching from the southeastern corner of the park at the intersection with Madison Avenue to the northeastern corner with State Street. All of Willett Street is in the historic district, including approximately 33 buildings. The street is entirely residential except for the First Presbyterian Church, built in 1883 on the corner with State Street. Willett Street has many different styles including Queen Anne, Spanish Revival, Classical revival, Georgian, Romanesque, Italianate, and brownstones. Two larger apartment buildings, built in 1909 and 1927, break up the otherwise continuous row of older townhouses. One of those apartment buildings is the Willett, formerly the Wareham, a five-story building built in 1909 that spans 84–92 Willett Street. This building sits on a former site of the New York State Normal College, predecessor to the University at Albany, which burned in 1906. The oldest building on Willett to maintain its original facade, 22 Willett, was built in 1872. Nearby 28 Willett Street was the home of Martin Glynn, an owner and publisher of the Albany Times Union, a state comptroller, and the governor of New York from 1913 to 1914. Glynn was the first Catholic New York governor and the only longtime Albany resident to reach that position.

=== Madison Avenue ===
Madison Avenue is part of the cross-country US Route 20, and at four lanes wide it is the busiest street in the district. Recently a road diet decreased the lanes to 2 lanes with a center turning lane and bike lanes. Roughly 90 buildings on Madison Avenue face the park. East of the intersection with Robin Street, Madison is more urban with 19th-century rowhouses; west of Robin Street is dominated by large detached residences, many of which have been converted to medical offices. A few buildings, such as 694 and 710 Madison predate park improvements that occurred across the street at the Taylor property, which later became basketball and tennis courts. 682 Madison was formerly the home of the Academy of Holy Names. It is currently administrative offices for the Albany Medical Center Foundation.

=== South Lake Avenue ===
South Lake Avenue facing Washington Park consists of 23 rowhouses, a modern apartment building, and a converted carriage house. The Elouise Apartments were built in 1927 in the Classical Revival architecture style and are eight stories tall. 55 South Lake Avenue is in the Art Deco style, while 57 to 87 South Lake, built in 1896–97 is a row of yellow brick facades designed by Albert Fuller.

=== Englewood Place and Thurlow Terrace ===
Englewood Place and Thurlow Terrace were constructed by the Commissioners of Washington Park and maintained by them for some time, with half the maintenance cost assessed on the private property facing the street. Restrictions were placed to prevent fences and unwelcome uses to preserve a park-like appearance.

Englewood Place was a part of Robin Street until receiving its current name in the 1870s; it was laid out in lots in 1879, with large mansions and carriage houses built between 1879 and 1887. 5 and 7 Englewood Place were designed by Robert Gibson, who also designed the All Saints Cathedral. 5 Englewood Place became the residence of the University at Albany's president after 1997. Thurlow Terrace was developed a decade after Englewood. 8 Thurlow Terrace was the residence of the Albany Catholic bishops until 1957. From 1958 to 1972 the State University of New York owned 7, 8, 9, and 10 Thurlow Terrace as their central administration, prior to moving to One Commerce Plaza.

== See also ==
- National Register of Historic Places listings in Albany, New York
