= Statue of Robert Burns (Albany, New York) =

Public sculpture by Charles Calverley

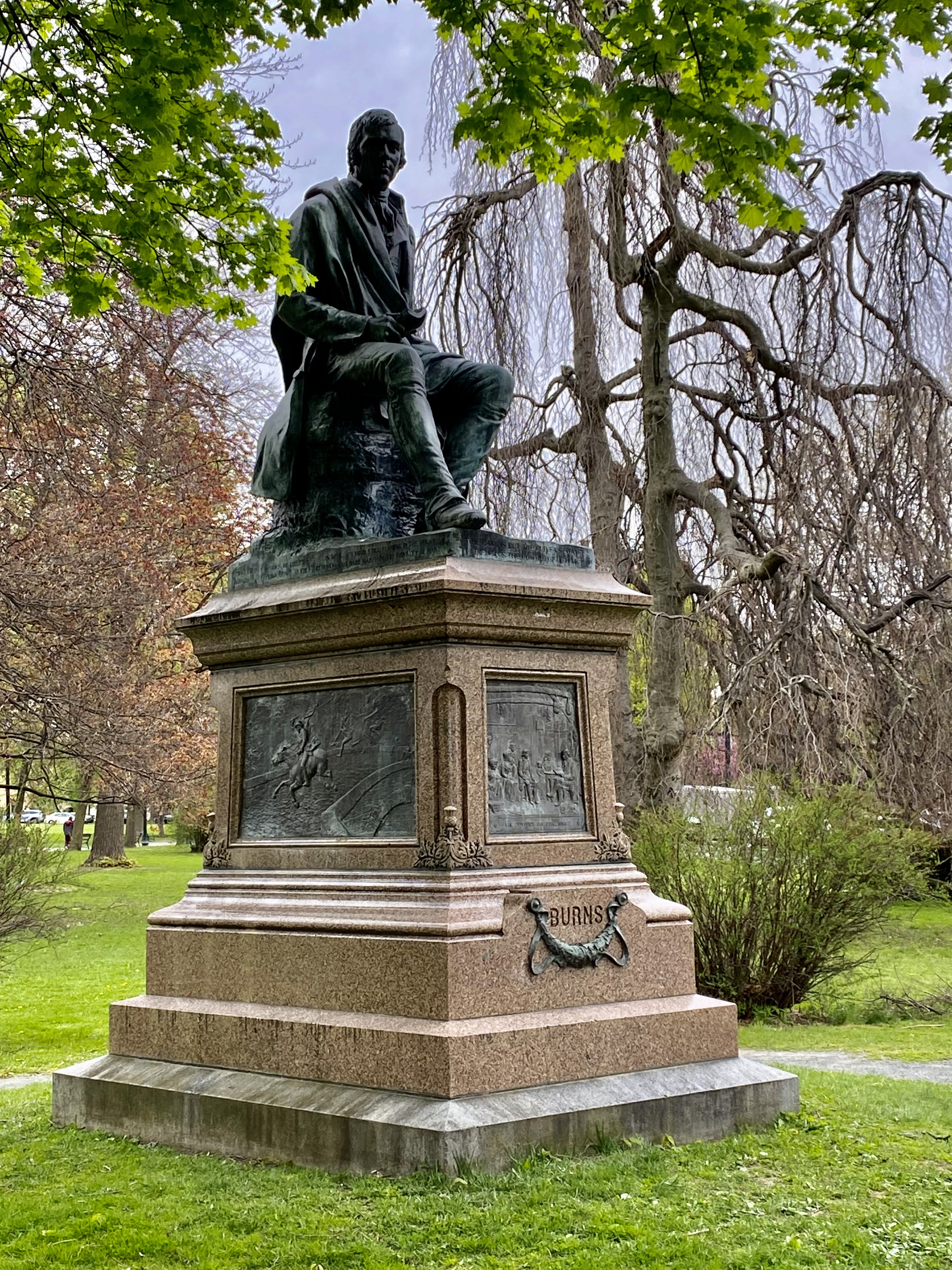
- The statue in 2022
- Location: Washington Park, Albany, New York, United States
- Coordinates: 42.655077°N 73.767975°W
- Designer: Charles Calverley
- Fabricator: Henry-Bonnard Company
- Type: Statue
- Material: Bronze; Granite
- Height: 16 feet (4.9 m)
- Dedicated date: August 30, 1888
- Dedicated to: Robert Burns

A statue of Robert Burns stands in Washington Park in Albany, New York, United States. The statue was designed by Charles Calverley and was unveiled in 1888. Four bas-reliefs around its pedestal, in part designed by George Henry Boughton, were later added in 1891. The statue is one of the oldest pieces of public art in the park.

== History ==
=== Background ===
Robert Burns was a Scottish poet active during the 1700s. Considered Scotland's national poet, he was a significant figure in the Romantic era and considered a cultural icon both in his home country and among the Scottish diaspora. One such group made up of members of this diaspora, the Saint Andrew's Society of Albany, New York, was established in 1803 and consisted of Scottish Americans. In 1886, Mary McPherson, a wealthy Scottish immigrant in Albany, died and left in her will funds to build a monument to Robert Burns. Peter Kinnear, a member of the society, served as the executor for her will and oversaw the creation of the monument. In March 1886, Kinnear traveled to New York City and, upon the recommendation of noted painter William Hart, commissioned Charles Calverley to design the monument. Calverley, a native of Albany, had worked as a stonecutter in that city before becoming an assistant for sculptor Erastus Dow Palmer and, by the time of his commissioning, had become a successful portrait sculptor in New York City. He would later create several memorials in Albany Rural Cemetery. The statue was cast by the Henry-Bonnard Company of New York City. The pedestal for the monument was prepared at Aberdeen in Scotland, while the base was prepared at Quincy, Massachusetts. On June 30, 1888, Kinnear oversaw the cornerstone laying ceremony, which was performed by Freemasons from the Grand Lodge of New York. On August 1, both the base and pedestal were set up in Washington Park. On August 29, the statue arrived in the city and was erected atop the pedestal.

=== Dedication ===
The statue was dedicated on August 30, 1888. (Note: Some sources give this date as September 30, 1888.) In the days before this, invitations had been extended to Scottish groups throughout North America, with many traveling to Albany to see the unveiling. The ceremony commenced with a parade at 3 p.m. of members of these various groups which ended at the site of the statue. At this point, a crowd of several thousand had gathered around the statue, which was draped with an American flag. Kinnear gave the opening address of the ceremony, where he spoke about the McPherson family. Following this, The Reverend Robert Collyer, orator for the ceremony, gave an address where he spoke about Burns and his legacy. During this speech, the flag covering the statue fell slightly, exposing Burns's head. This caused a slight disruption among the crowd, and the band played "Ye Banks and Braes" before Collyer continued his speech without further interruption. After Collyer, The Reverend George C. Lorimer of Albany's First Baptist Church gave a brief speech, which was followed by a rendition of "There was a Lad was born in Kyle" performed by Thomas Impett of Troy, New York. Following this, the statue was officially unveiled and Kinnear presented it to park officials. Abraham Lansing accepted the statue on behalf of park commissioners. Celebrations at the statue then ended with Impett's performance of "Auld Lang Syne".

Following this, festivities continued at Union Hall, where Kinnear gave an opening address which was followed by short addresses by William B. Smith (president of the North American United Caledonian Association) and John Kinnear (Royal Chief of the Order of Scottish Clans). Numerous Scottish ballads were also sung. Additional festivities took place at the Delavan House. Albany mayor Edward A. Maher gave a brief speech, which was followed by other addresses, though numerous expected speakers were absent from the celebrations. The celebrations ended with several more toasts and a singing of "Auld Lang Syne". In total, celebrations had continued until past 2 am

=== Later history ===
In 1890, Calverley was commissioned to create a bust of Burns for Andrew Carnegie's personal library. Carnegie had been aware of the statue in Washington Park before commissioning Calverley and was so pleased with the result that he had a second bust cast in 1891 for display at the Metropolitan Museum of Art.

In 1891, four bas-reliefs were added to the monument's pedestal. The reliefs were created by Calverley based in part on designs by his friend George Henry Boughton. (Note: One source goes as far as to state that Boughton designed the panels.)

In 1978, the Saint Andrew's Society of Albany funded a conservation of the monument.

== Design ==
The monument, which stands 16 feet (4.9 m) tall, consists of a bronze statue of Burns in a seated position, with a Kilmarnock Bonnet in his left hand and a book in his right hand, which is resting on his knee. Both the pedestal and base are made of granite, and the entire monument is surrounded by a circular path. It is located near the park entrance by Hudson Avenue and Henry Johnson Boulevard. The bas-reliefs attached around the pedestal are illustrations of scenes from four of Burns's poems: "Tam o' Shanter", "To a Mountain Daisy", "The Cotter's Saturday Night", and "Auld Lang Syne".

== See also ==
- 1888 in art
- List of Robert Burns memorials

== Bibliography ==
- Historical Sketch of the Burns Statue, the McPherson Legacy to the City of Albany. Albany, New York: Weed, Parsons & Co. 1889 – via Google Books.
- 1803–1903 Centennial Year: Historical Sketch of St. Andrew's Society of the City of Albany. Compiled by Peter Kinnear. Albany, New York: Weed-Parsons Printing Company. 1903 – via Google Books.
- "Robert Burns". Metropolitan Museum of Art. Archived from the original on January 24, 2021.
- Muir, John, ed. (January 25, 1892). Annual Burns Chronicle and Club Directory. Kilmarnock: D. Brown & Co. – via Google Books.
- Waite, Diana S., ed. (1993). Albany Architecture: A Guide to the City. Photographs by Gary Gold and Mark McCarty. Albany, New York: Mount Ida Press. ISBN 978-0-9625368-1-6 – via Google Books.
- "Celebrating Robert Burns". Washington Park Conservancy. January 23, 2020. Archived from the original on January 20, 2021.
