= Ben Arnold =

Ben Arnold may refer to:

- Ben Arnold, Texas, an unincorporated community in Milam County, Texas, United States
- Ben Arnold (bishop) (1915–1992), suffragan bishop of Massachusetts, 1972–1982
- Ben Arnold (racing driver) (1936–2011), stock car racing driver
- Ben Arnold (judge) (1892–1955), associate justice of the Oklahoma Supreme Court, 1941–1953
- Ben Arnold (field hockey) (born 1990), English field hockey player

== See also ==
- Benjamin Arnold (disambiguation)
- Benedict Arnold (disambiguation)
