= Lincoln Park (Albany, New York) =

Urban park

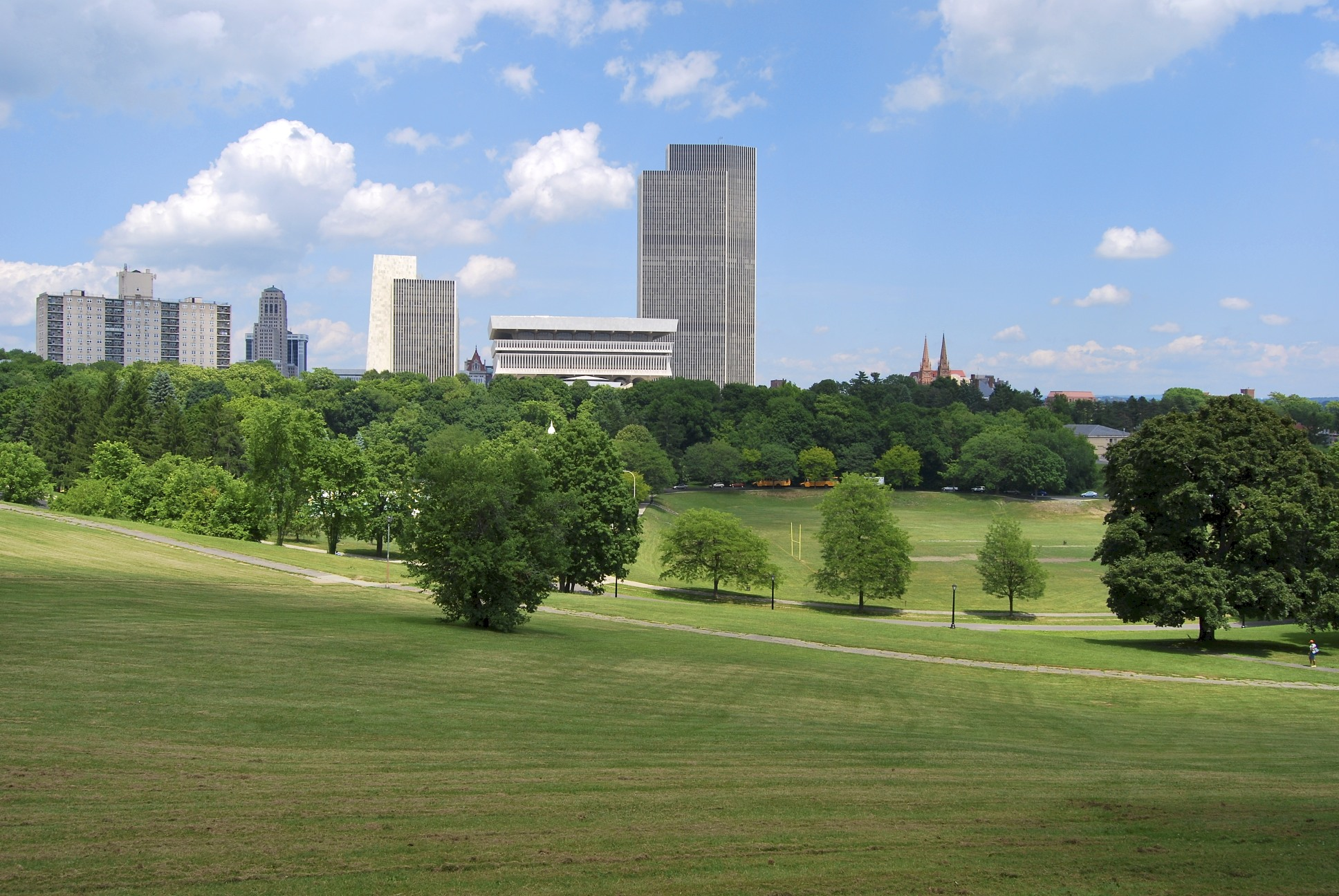
- Empire State Plaza seen from the south side of Lincoln Park
- Interactive map of Lincoln Park
- Type: Urban park
- Location: Albany, New York
- Coordinates: 42.64531°N 73.76399°W
- Area: 68 acres (28 ha)
- Created: 1900
- Operator: City of Albany
- Status
- Lincoln Park
- U.S. National Register of Historic Places
- NRHP reference No.: 100000890
- Added to NRHP: February 20, 2018

Lincoln Park is an urban park in Albany, New York, with a unique history, from being the site of a skirmish in 1626 between the Dutch and Mohawks to brickyards and breweries to being Albany's first public playground. The park features Albany's only outdoor non-wading swimming pool, along with several tennis courts, basketball courts, and football and baseball fields. Within the park is the James Hall Office, a National Historic Landmark, and the Thomas O'Brien Academy of Science and Technology (TOAST) an elementary school.

In 2018 the park was listed on the National Register of Historic Places.

== History ==
Lincoln Park sits mostly in a large basin or ravine carved by the Beaver Kill, a stream that flowed from the west to the Hudson River. In 1626 the commander of the Dutch Republic's colonial outpost Fort Orange along with a company of six soldiers accompanied their allies, the Mohicans, in their war against the Mohawks. They were ambushed on the site of the future Lincoln Park near Delaware Avenue, during the battle the commander and three of the soldiers died. As the city grew the kill (Dutch for creek) and the land in the area came to be owned by the Dutch Reformed Church. Evert Wendell, perhaps illegally as a squatter, built saw and grist mills and a brewery on that land prior to 1737, using the water power from the kill. These improvements were located near the Lincoln Park swimming pool and where Hawk Street would be if extended through the park. By 1800 the mills were deteriorated and abandoned, and soon after 40 acres (16 ha) were sold as pasture.

Due to the fine natural clay banks along the gorge carved by the Beaver Kill several brickyards came to be established in Lincoln Park during the 19th century, mostly along Morton Avenue between Hawk and Eagle. The Beaver Kill's natural waterfall, west of the intersection of Park Avenue and South Swan Street provided for waterwheel power for local industry. Industry continued to be located around the falls, especially breweries which would dump so much waste product into the Beaver Kill that the falls became known as Buttermilk Falls.

What is today the southwestern corner of the park was once owned by James Hall who owned an office built around 1852 and a house around 1880 along Delaware Avenue. The first portion of the park to be opened was a children's playground that was built by the Mother's Club (today the Women's Club of Albany), and this included Hall's land. It was Albany's first park that was more than passive, it was the city's first public playground and was called the Central Playground. Hall's office became the location of indoor children's activities, and the site of his house would later become the site of today's tennis courts.

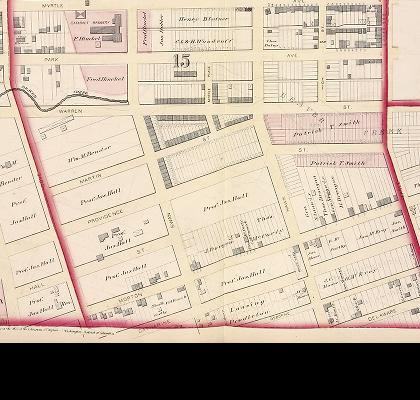
1878 map of streets and Beaver Creek in future Lincoln Park

West of Hawk Street was the location of Martinville, an Irish shanty town from the American Civil War era, named for its builder James Martin. Through Chapter 449 of the Laws of 1890 the Commissioners of Washington Park received authorization to acquire land for Beaver Park, an irregular shaped area corresponding to the majority of present-day Lincoln Park east of Swan Street. Under plans drawn by Charles Downing Lay and Arnold Brunner, published in 1914 as Stvdies for Albany the eastern section of the park was developed. The original plan was more elaborate and grand than what was actually built. But the basic plan for athletic fields, a swimming pool, bathhouse, and children's activities were kept. These developments in the early 20th century included the destruction of Martinville in 1910 and a swimming pool in 1915 was constructed, but was contaminated due to the proximity of the sewer that was the underground Beaver Creek. In 1930 the current swimming pool was constructed in its place.

In 1954 Albany Public School 24 (PS 24) was built in the northwestern corner of the park off Delaware Avenue, previously having been in an 1893 building several blocks north. In 1990 the school was renamed the Thomas O'Brien Academy of Science and Technology (TOAST).

In 1982 a proposal was made to Mayor Erastus Corning 2nd for a civic center in the eastern section of Lincoln Park. The mayor was receptive to the plan and inquired to the state about use of parking facilities at the Empire State Plaza in conjunction with the civic center. The next year another group of investors proposed to the mayor regarding a civic center in Lincoln Park. The mayor, who would die four months later, responded with "Please discuss this with Jim Coyne", who was the Albany County executive. Later that year Coyne announced plans for a county-owned civic center facility, and though the Lincoln Park site was proposed at public hearings, the first site chosen was in Latham before finally settling on South Pearl Street in Downtown Albany (today the Times Union Center).

In 1989 the prologue to the first Tour de Trump featured a loop through Lincoln Park.

In 1993 South Swan Street within the park, from Morton Avenue to Myrtle Avenue, was renamed Dr. Martin Luther King Jr. Boulevard and a statue of King was erected at the corner of said boulevard and Morton Avenue. Martin Luther King III was in attendance at the unveiling as the guest speaker. The statue comprises an 8-foot (2.4 m) tall statue with panels of granite etched with images from throughout his life and of lines of his speeches.

The Lincoln Park pool bathhouse was gutted and renovated in 2001 at a cost of $3 million.

== Festivals ==
Many festivals, concerts, and parties have been held over the years in the park. In 1949 the "I am an American" Day celebration in Lincoln Park overshadowed the first annual Tulip Fest in Washington Park. Over 25,000 people attended the anti-Communist Cold War event which featured heavy-weight boxing champ Jack Dempsey and two-time-Oscar-winning actor Harold Russell. As part of their farewell tour the Ramones played in Lincoln Park at the University at Albany, SUNY's 1996 Party at the Park. The Northeast Rugby Union's Division II Women's Championship was held in Lincoln Park in 2002. As part of the 300th anniversary of the Dongan Charter incorporating Albany as a city, Lincoln Park was the site of a hot-air balloon launch and a reenactment of a skirmish of US Revolutionary War forces.

The annual NYS Dr. Martin Luther King Jr. Holiday Memorial Observance ends each year with a "Beloved Community March" that travels from the Empire State Plaza concourse entrance on Madison Avenue to Swan Street (which turns into Dr. Martin Luther King Boulevard at the entrance to the park) and ends at the King Monument with the laying of a wreath.

== Facilities and activities ==
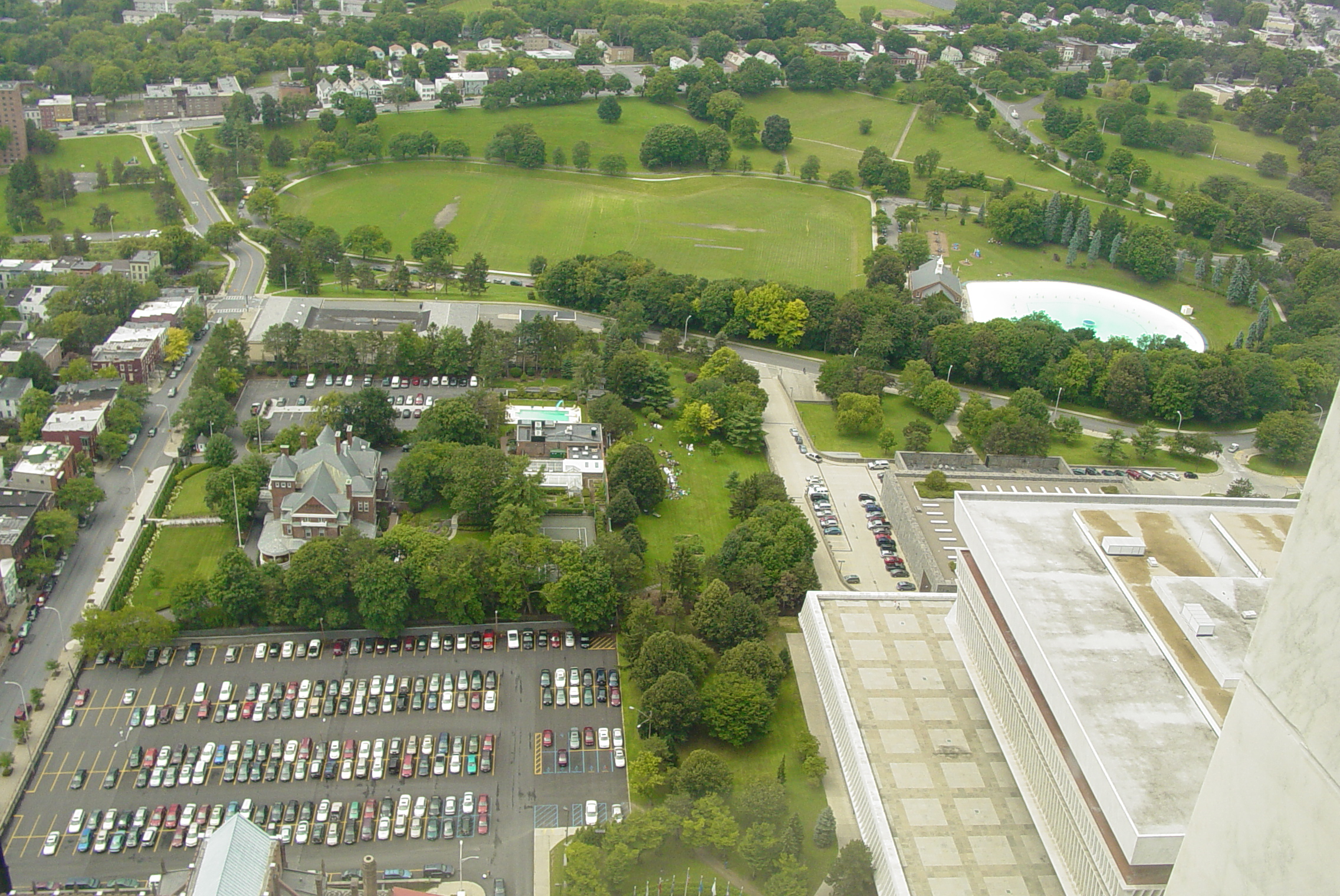
Lincoln Park as seen from the Corning Tower of the Empire State Plaza.

The park contains the larger of Albany's two public pools, the Lincoln Park Pool. It covers approximately 2 acres (0.81 ha), is 7 feet (2.1 m) deep in center, and can hold over 300 swimmers at a time. The pool may be the largest cement pool in the Northeastern United States. In 1988 the pool was given a half a million dollar renovation after leaking so badly the year before that it was losing a quarter of its water daily. The park also has a wading pool and spray pool. Lincoln Park has multiple tennis courts, basketball courts, handball courts, and playgrounds as well as ball fields. A youth fitness center (ages 7–19) with a gym, weight room, and activities such as wrestling, karate, dance fitness, and cardio. Since the park's primary purpose is as a public outdoor sports/fitness activity center, the park sees many spontaneous non-traditional activities by the public ranging such as Tai chi on the tennis courts.

Until 2011, two public schools were located within Lincoln Park, though the land they sit on was owned by the City School District of Albany and not by the city as part of the park. They are the Thomas O'Brien Academy of Science and Technology (TOAST) and the Sunshine School. TOAST still operates as a pre-K through 5 elementary magnet school and the Sunshine School was used for transitioning at-risk students in grades 9-12 from places such as jail, prison, juvenile detention centers, New York State Office of Children and Family Services, or drug treatment facilities. In January 2011 The Sunshine School was moved to Watervliet Ave. and the Sunshine School building was offered for sale in 2012. The Sunshine School is located in James Hall's former office. TOAST has an associated Outdoor Learning Center in the park and a Geological Rock Park that opened in 2001. Adjacent to the school's Geological Rock Park are 50 1-2 ton boulders from across the state of New York that are being temporarily stored there until a permanent home can be given to them on the grounds of the New York State Museum, both the state's boulders and the Geological Rock Park are open to the public.

Capital District Community Gardens (CDCG) has a community garden with 51 10-by-10-foot (3.0 m × 3.0 m) plots located in the park off Eagle Street.

For 55 years the American Little League of Albany has sold Christmas trees on the tennis courts in the park as a fund raiser.

As of 2015, the park has been a regular training ground for Albany's Gaelic Football club, the James Connolly Albany Rebels.

== See also ==
- National Register of Historic Places listings in Albany, New York
