= Benjamin Walworth Arnold House and Carriage House =

Historic house in New York, United States

- U.S. National Register of Historic Places
- U.S. Historic district – Contributing property
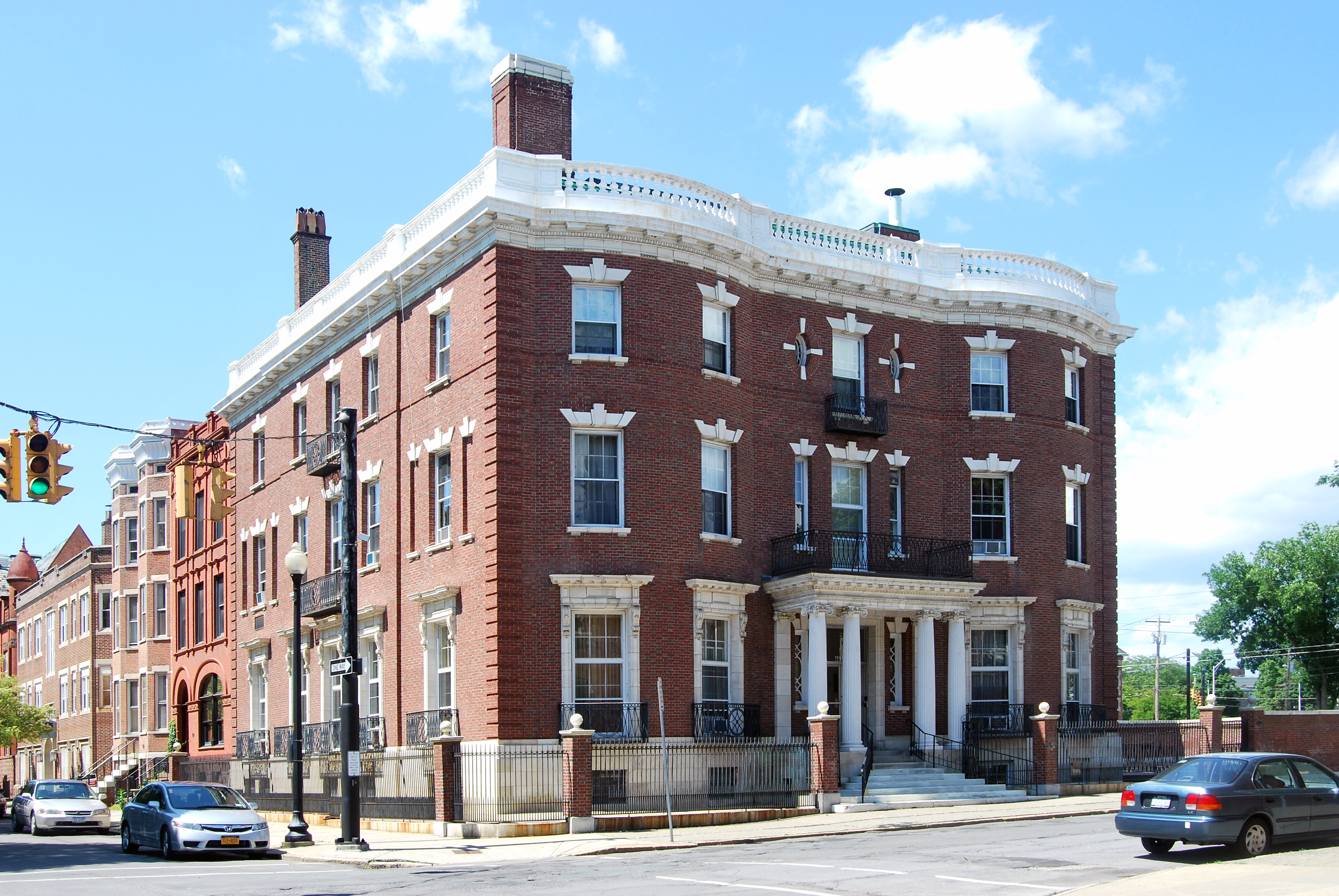
- South profile and east elevation of house, 2011

- Location within New York Location within the United States
- Interactive map showing the location of Benjamin Walworth Arnold House
- Location: Albany, NY
- Coordinates: 42°39′30″N 73°46′6″W
- Area: less than one acre
- Built: 1902.
- Architect: Stanford White
- Architectural style: Colonial Revival
- Part of: Washington Park Historic District
- NRHP reference No.: 82003342
- Added to NRHP: July 26, 1982

The Benjamin Walworth Arnold House and Carriage House are located on State Street and Washington Avenue in Albany, New York, United States. They are brick structures dating to the beginning of the 20th century. In 1972 they were included as a contributing property to the Washington Park Historic District when it was listed on the National Register of Historic Places. In 1982 they were listed individually as well.

Stanford White designed the buildings, which would be his only work in the city, for a local lumber magnate. They attracted considerable attention when they were completed as the first Colonial Revival buildings in Albany, and its first fully electrified house. The house is today the offices of the New York State Catholic Conference, and the carriage house an architectural firm's office.

== Buildings ==
Both buildings are near Sprague Place, a short north–south street that connects State and Washington just north of the 81-acre (33 ha) Washington Park. The house is on a one-acre (4,000 m^{2}) lot taking up, along with a parking lot to the north, the entire west side of the block at the northwest corner of the intersection of State and Sprague opposite the park. The carriage house is on the north side of Washington where it forks to the north from Western Avenue, opposite the intersection of those two streets with Sprague. The surrounding neighborhood is densely developed and urban, with most buildings from the same era, originally designed for residential use. Some mature trees are planted among them, making the transition to the large park to the south less abrupt.

=== House ===
The house is a three-story five-by-five-bay structure of brick laid in Flemish bond, with corner quoins, on an exposed white marble foundation. It is topped by a flat roof pierced by three brick chimneys. On the east (front) facade the two bays flanking the center are on rounded projections. An iron fence with brick posts topped by wooden spheres sets it off from the streets on the south and east.

On the first floor of both facades windows are six-over-six double-hung sash. They have marble trim with consoles supporting bracketed cornices and entablatures. Small iron railings are attached to the sills. The second and third floor windows are less elaborate, with marble sills and keystoned lintels. On the east facade, the central window has two narrow flanking windows with the same treatment, and the window above it has a small balcony with iron railing and two small keystoned round windows. To the south, where the middle three bays form a slightly projecting pavilion, the end windows on the second story have narrow flanking windows, and the central windows on the upper stories have balconies. At the roofline is a classically inspired cornice with modillion blocks and guttae topped with a wooden balustrade. The north facade, otherwise similar to the south, has a projecting conservatory in the center. On the west there is no facade as the building is joined to the one next to it along State Street.

Marble steps lead up to the main entrance and a marble porch with paired fluted Ionic columns supporting a marble entablature. Above the porch is an iron balustrade forming a balcony. The doorway, in a marble surround, is flanked by two narrow keystoned windows similar to those on the second story. A modern glass and steel door with a transom opens into a central hallway with wooden wainscoting. Decorated lintels are atop the doorways, bridged by a Doric frieze below the ceiling. Its west end is a wooden staircase with three types of Georgian turned balusters.

The southeast room is decorated in an Adamesque style, featuring an onyx mantelpiece. To its west is the library, now used as a conference room. Its oak flooring is laid out in a herringbone pattern. Mahogany moldings, chimney breasts and cornice complete the room. The dining room, opposite, is paneled in darker mahogany, complemented by a green marble mantelpiece. Its north wall opens into the conservatory. Next to the dining room is a small breakfast room with mirrors and wooden latticework on its walls. The northeast corner room is done in dark paneling and hand-tooled leather. Another room in the house has a strapped plaster ceiling. The rooms on the second and third stories are more modest, with some having mantelpieces of their own. The billiards room on the third floor has dark paneling and a large fireplace.

=== Carriage house ===
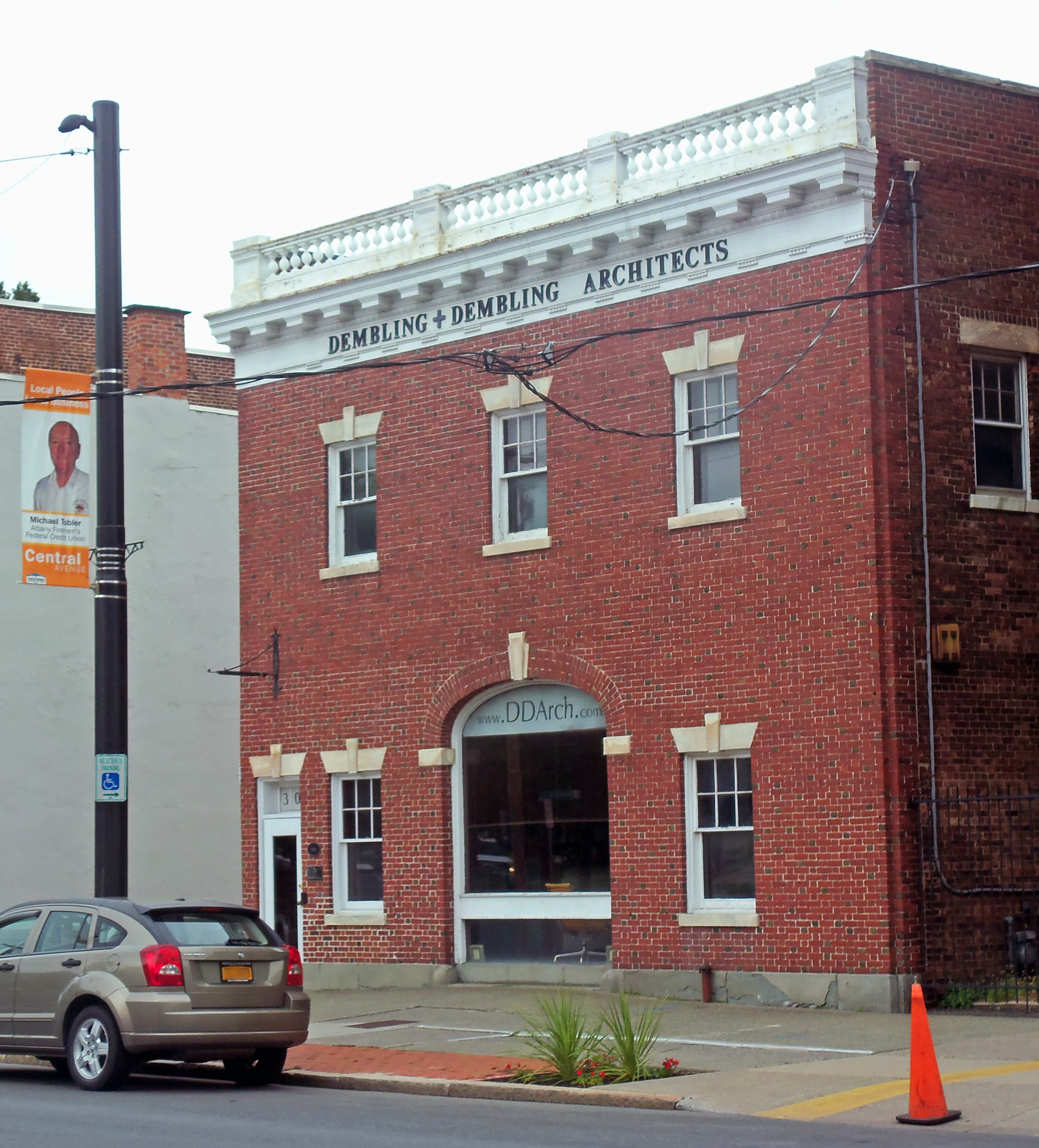
Carriage house

Like the house, the carriage house is of brick on a marble foundation, with marble trim. It is two stories tall. At its roofline is a Doric cornice and balustrade. The door and six-over-one double-hung sash windows are capped with flat marble arches. Like the main house, bricks on the south (front) facade are laid in Flemish bond, the other three are in common bond. The north and east facades have windows while the west is blind as it once abutted a neighboring building. Inside its walls were historically unfinished brick and the floor partially paved, with minimal decoration, although that has been changed by the building's adaption for office use.

== History ==
In 1853, Benjamin W. Arnold of Albany had established his lumber business in partnership with a Michigan man. By the 1880s they were selling lumber from all over the Great Lakes via the Erie Canal. A thousand employees worked in their mills, and the firm had a large portion of dock space on Albany's waterfront. Benjamin Walworth Arnold succeeded his father upon his 1891 death and continued to expand the business. He eventually became president of the Duluth and Northern Minnesota Railroad, and married into the Van Rensselaer family, descendants of the patroons of the area during Dutch Colonial times.

By the turn of the century the lumber business in Albany was declining as forests and markets opened up further west. Arnold turned his attentions to more local industries, such as banking, and began giving away money to local causes. In 1904 he commissioned Stanford White, who had worked for Henry Hobson Richardson as a draftsman thirty years earlier on the state capitol but had not built anything of his own in the city, to design a house on the site of an old chapel that was demolished to make way for it, along with a carriage house on a nearby block. It used the new Colonial Revival architectural style, very different from the homes of other wealthy Albany residents built in the area at the time, making it the subject of extended commentary in local newspapers of the time. It was also the first fully electrified home in the city. White, who did not remain in Albany to oversee the construction, was murdered by Harry Thaw two years later, leaving Arnold's buildings as his only work in Albany.

Arnold himself died in 1932, after spending the later years of his life as a trustee of many local colleges and a director of local banks. His widow remained in the property until her death in 1945. The estate sold the house to the New York State College for Teachers (now part of the State University of New York at Albany), which used it as a fraternity house and dormitory. Two local auto mechanics bought the carriage house and converted it into an auto repair shop.

In 1956 the Roman Catholic Diocese of Albany bought the house and converted its second floor to office space. A decade later they renovated the first floor, and it served as the bishop's residence for some time after that. It is currently the offices of the New York State Catholic Conference. A local insurance company bought the carriage house in 1977 and converted it for office use. It is now used by an architectural firm.

== See also ==
- National Register of Historic Places listings in Albany, New York
