= Washington Park Lake =

Lake in Albany, New York, United States

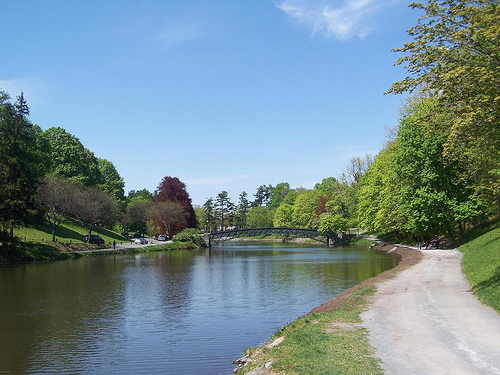
- Washington Park lake looking north towards the pedestrian bridge.

- Location within New York
- Location: Albany, New York
- Coordinates: 42°39′26″N 73°46′23″W
- Type: Artificial
- Basin countries: United States
- Managing agency: City of Albany
- Built: 1873
- Max. length: 1,600 ft (490 m)
- Max. width: 140 ft (43 m)
- Surface area: 5.2 acres (2.1 ha)
- Average depth: 6.6 ft (2.0 m)
- Max. depth: 11 ft (3.4 m)
- Water volume: 1,588,400 ft^{3} (44,980 m^{3})

Washington Park Lake is a body of water in Albany, New York located in the southwestern corner of Washington Park. It has a surface area of 5.2 acres (21,000 m^{2}) and a mean depth of 6.6 feet (2.0 m). The deepest sections of the lake are just over 11 feet (3.4 m) deep. The lake is roughly 1,600 feet (490 m) long and 140 feet (43 m) wide. Next to the lake is the Washington Park Lakehouse and an amphitheater where the Park Playhouse performs musicals in the summer. A wrought-iron pedestrian bridge spans the lake at its narrowest point. The footbridge over Washington Park Lake is the only remaining original structure in Washington Park. Erected over the lake in 1875 the lamps on the bridge were originally gas burning but were electrified in 1881. Ice skating is permitted on Washington Park Lake, though swimming is prohibited.

== History ==
In 1986 after years of the lake being two to three feet below its normal depth the city repaired cracks and leaks in a concrete spillway. After the lake continued to be approximately one foot below normal level, the next year another leak was found where a 70-foot-tall (21 m) beech tree had grown on top of a 19th-century brick sewer pipe that was along the southern shore of the lake. The break in the 5-foot-tall (1.5 m) sewer pipe created a sinkhole that allowed water from the lake to flow into the sewer. The same pipe caused more problems in 1995 and more repairs occurred.

In 1991 two days after copper sulfate was applied to the lake to kill algae a fish kill occurred due to a lack of oxygen in the water. Hundreds of fish died with many experiencing hypoxic conditions near the surface. The city hooked up a 200-foot (61 m) pipe to two compressors that pumped oxygen into the lake similar to an aerator in an aquarium. This raised oxygen levels quickly and fish returned to their normal behavior.

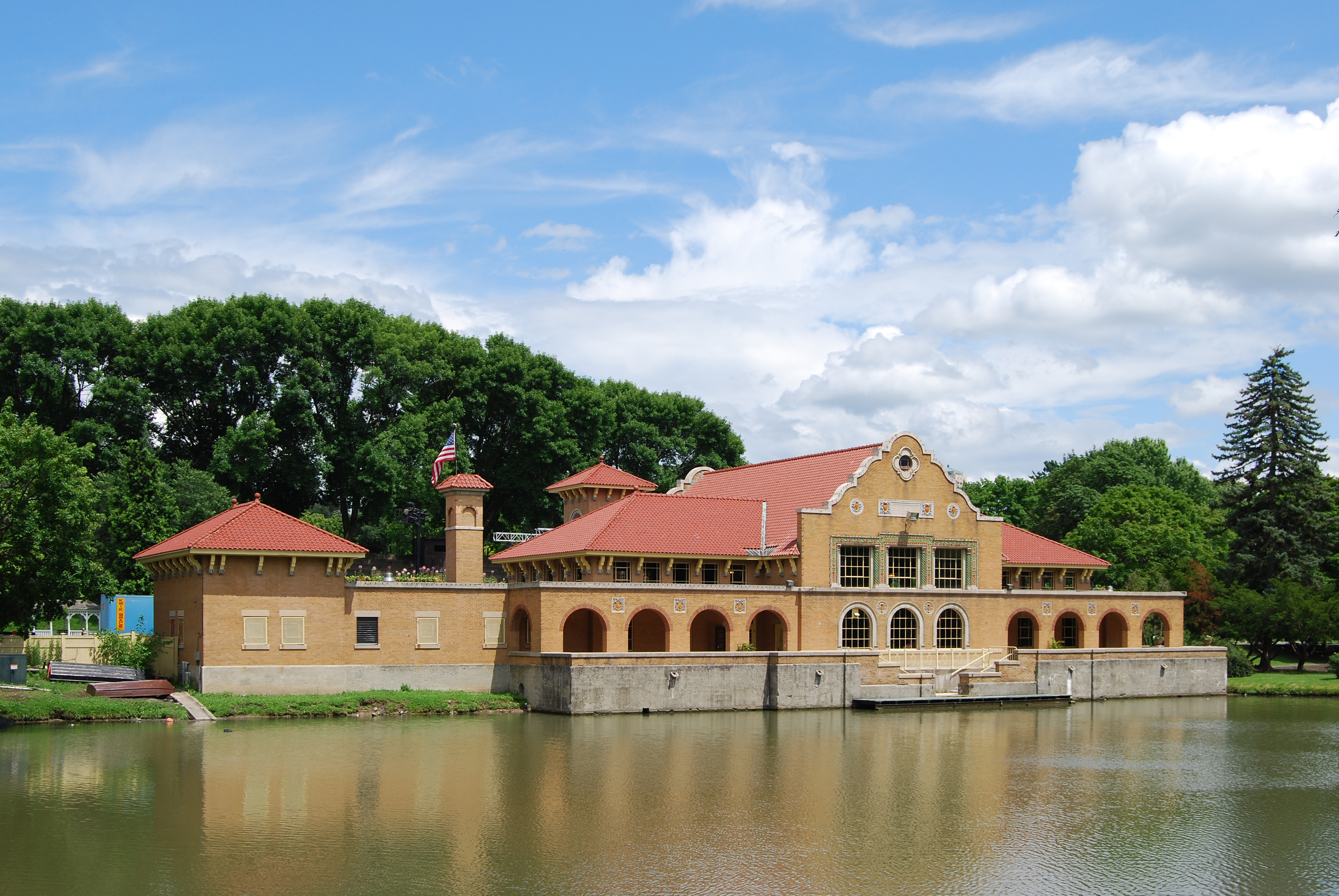
Washington Park Lake House, site of the Park Playhouse

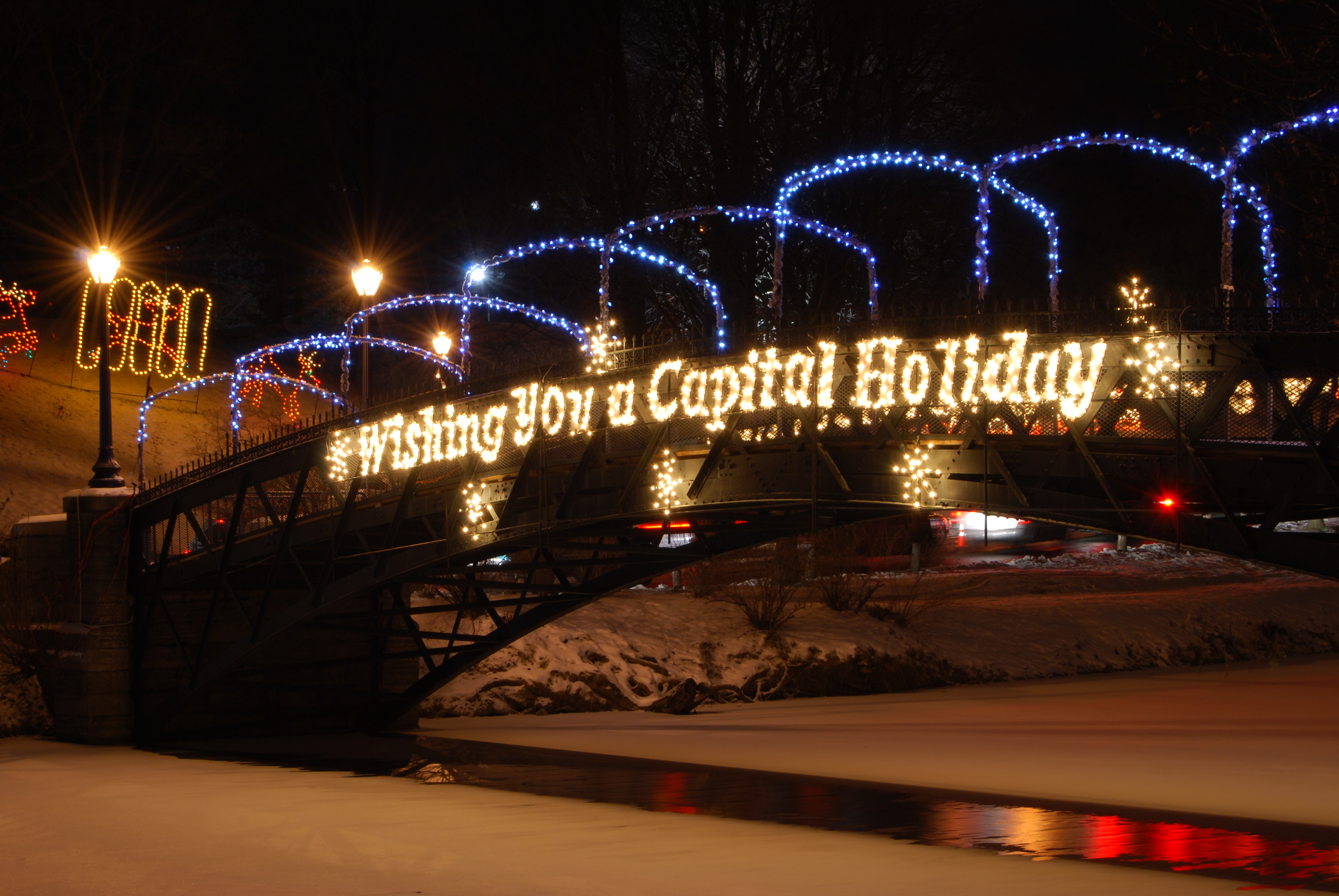
Washington Park Lake Bridge during Capital Holiday Lights
