= Benjamin W. Arnold =

American lumber businessman (1865–1932)

- Born: Benjamin Walworth Arnold; April 30, 1865; Albany, New York, U.S.
- Died: November 8, 1932 (aged 67); Albany, New York, U.S.
- Education: Hamilton College (AB, AM)
- Occupation: Businessman
- Spouse: Sarah Elizabeth Van Rensselaer (m. 1903)

Benjamin Walworth Arnold (April 30, 1865 – November 8, 1932) was an American lumber businessman from New York.

== Early life ==
Benjamin Walworth Arnold was born on April 30, 1865, in Albany, New York, to Jane Treat (née Avery) and Benjamin W. Arnold. His father ran a lumber operation in Albany with Alexander Folsom until 1890. He attended Albany Academy and the Clinton Grammar School. He graduated from Hamilton College in 1886 with a Bachelor of Arts and later in 1898 with a Master of Arts. He was a member of Alpha Delta Phi.

== Career ==
After graduating, Arnold worked in the lumber business in Michigan and in Canada. After his father's death in 1891, he succeeded him in the family's lumber business. He was a partner in Alger, Smith and Company. He was head of the Spanish River Lumber Company based in Spanish Mills, Ontario. He retired in 1925. He owned timber lands in Minnesota and Michigan. He was president of the Duluth and Northern Minnesota Railroad.

Arnold was elected a trustee of Hamilton College in 1901. In 1904, he served as a presidential elector for Theodore Roosevelt. He was a member of the New York State Board of Charities for a number of years. He served as honorary curator of ornithology at the New York State Museum. He served as president of the Dudley Observatory and trustee of the Albany Hospital. He was a director of the Mechanics and Farmers Bank and trustee of the Albany Savings Bank and the Fourth Presbyterian Church.

During World War I, Arnold was chairman of the home defense committee of Albany County.

== Personal life ==
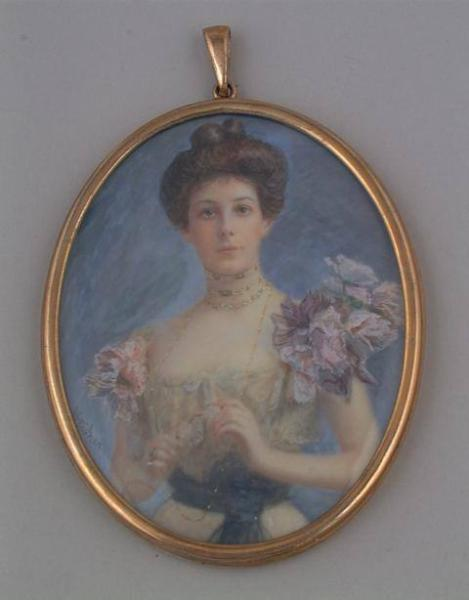
Miniature painting of Sarah Elizabeth Van Rensselaer

Arnold married Sarah Elizabeth Van Rensselaer, daughter of Killiaen Van Rensselaer, in Albany in 1903. He was an elder of the Fourth Presbyterian Church.

Arnold lived at 465 State Street in Albany. He owned the Benjamin Walworth Arnold House and Carriage House. He died on November 8, 1932, in Albany.

== Legacy ==
Arnold collected more than one hundred Philippine, Bahamian and American woods. These were donated to the Yale School of Forestry and were named the Benjamin Walworth Arnold Memorial Collection. He donated a collection of North American, South American, European, Falkland Island and African bird eggs to the New York State Museum.
