= Dongan Charter =

1686 charter for Albany, New York

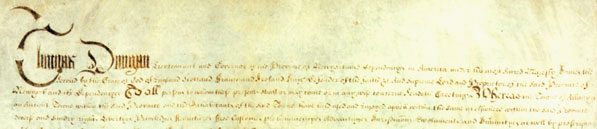
- Opening paragraph of the Dongan Charter
- Ratified: July 25, 1686
- Location: Albany County Hall of Records
- Author: Governor Thomas Dongan
- Purpose: Incorporated the City of Albany

The Dongan Charter is the 1686 document incorporating Albany, New York, as a city. Albany's charter was issued by Governor Thomas Dongan of the Province of New York, a few months after Governor Dongan issued a similarly worded, but less detailed charter for the city of New York. The city of Albany was created three years after Albany County. The charter is the oldest existing city charter still in force in the United States. According to Stefan Bielinski, former senior historian of the New York State Museum, the charter is also "arguably the longest-running instrument of municipal government in the Western Hemisphere." In 1936 the United States Congress commemorated the charter's 250th anniversary by minting a half dollar coin.

== History ==
After the city of New York received a municipal charter from Governor Dongan the governor came to Albany, at which time the village sent a delegation of prominent men to request a charter of their own. The Patroon, after being encouraged by the governor, finally released all claims to Albany and forfeited a strip of land 1 mile (1.6 km) wide and 16 miles (26 km) long to Albany. Albany at the time consisted of about 500 residents living in around 140 houses. In July 1686 a delegation led by Pieter Schuyler and Robert Livingston traveled to New York to receive the charter for Albany; the charter was signed on July 22, 1686, and was read aloud to the citizens of Albany on July 25. Due to England, and by extension Albany, using the Julian calendar at the time, the corrected date for the signing of the document under the Gregorian calendar is August 1, 1686.

During Leisler's Rebellion Jacob Leisler demanded the charters of Albany and the city of New York be forfeited, and New York yielded but Albany's mayor, Pieter Schuyler, refused. Schuyler went on to become one of the major leaders in suppressing the rebellion. The next major threat to the charter government came during the American Revolution when the Common Council stopped meeting in 1775. The local Committee of Safety took over daily functions until 1778 when the Common Council began meeting again.

A Dongan Charter Parade was held in 1936 for the 250th anniversary celebrations, and as part of the ceremonies the United States Congress authorized the minting of an Albany Charter half dollar coin. Tricentennial celebrations held in 1986 included a re-enactment of the signing and awarding of the charter by Governor Mario Cuomo playing Governor Dongan, and Mayor Thomas Whalen playing Mayor Schuyler. Other events during the tricentennial were fireworks, music, the unveiling of a tricentennial clock, a hot-air balloon lift-off from Lincoln Park, and a cake large enough to feed thousands. Mayors from other Albanys around the world were among the visiting dignitaries who were invited to the ceremonies and given a tour of the city by Mayor Whalen.

== Provisions ==
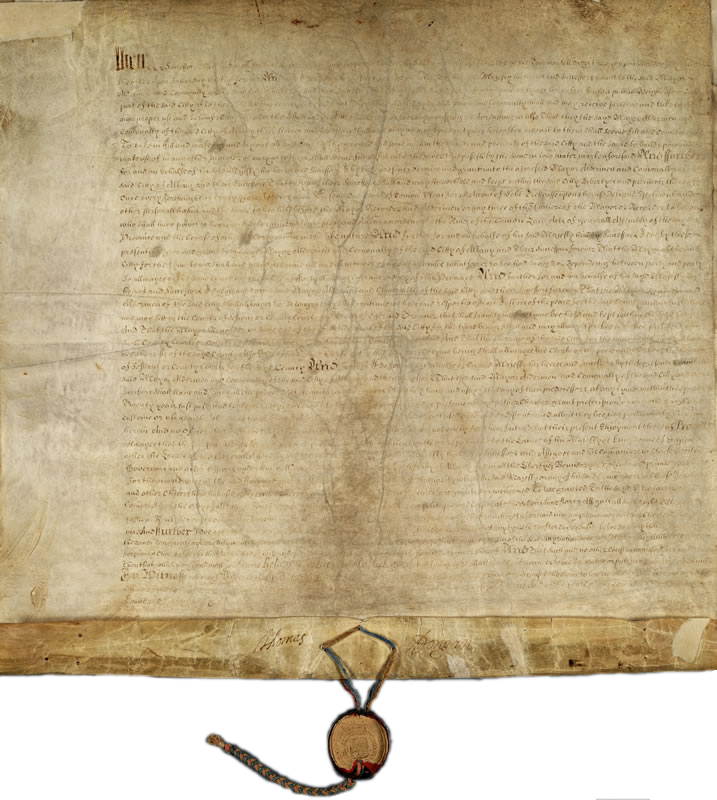
The original Dongan Charter partially unfolded

The charter turned the village of Albany into a city under the name of "The Mayor, Aldermen, and Commonalty of the city of Albany";. This legally separated it from Rensselaerswyck, a nearby colonial estate. The charter also established Albany's boundaries and a municipal government, as well as specifically naming the first officers. Certain special rights were put into the charter as well, such as the exclusive right to negotiate with the Native Americans. It also established Albany as the sole market town in the upper Hudson region, with the right to purchase land at Tionnderoge and Schaghticoke.

The mayor of Albany was the executive officer and selected by the Lieutenant Governor. He was also designated as the clerk of the marketplace and the coroner for both the city and Albany County. Two aldermen and two assistant aldermen were chosen from each ward and sat on the Common Council along with the mayor and recorder. The mayor, recorder, and aldermen were also justices, the assistants however did not have any judicial powers.

The sole right to issue trading privileges anywhere in Albany County rested with the mayor and Common Council. Albany County encompassed all of Upstate New York north and west of Ulster County at that time, as well as the state of Vermont. All residents of New York, except those of Albany, were specifically banned from trading with any Iroquois nation, or with any other native tribe to the west, east, or north of the city of Albany, or with native tribes anywhere within Albany County.

== Amendments ==
The Dongan Charter was first amended on March 21, 1787, to remove the mayor's powers to act as the city and county's sole coroner, and to regulate trade with Indians. It continued to be used with only minor changes until March 16, 1870, when it saw major changes by the state legislature in 1870 and 1883. In the 1870 revision, the city's official name was changed from "The Mayor, Aldermen, and Commonalty of the city of Albany" to the "City of Albany". In 1998, the charter was almost completely rewritten after a municipal referendum. Legally, however, the revised charter was reckoned as an amendment to the Dongan Charter.

== Commemorative coin ==
The United States Congress authorized on June 16, 1936, the minting of 25,000 half dollar coins celebrating the 250th anniversary of the Dongan Charter.
