= 1943 Darwen by-election =

UK by-election

The 1943 Darwen by-election was a by-election held on 15 December 1943 for the British House of Commons constituency of Darwen in Lancashire.

== Vacancy ==
The seat had become vacant after the death in October of the Conservative Member of Parliament (MP) Stuart Russell, who had been killed in World War II. He had been elected at the 1935 general election, beating the Liberal Party leader Sir Herbert Samuel.

== Election history ==
In the 1935 general election, the Conservatives had won 41% of the votes, with a narrow majority over the outgoing Liberal MP. The result at the last General election was

1935 general election: Darwen Electorate
Party	Candidate	Votes	%	±%
Conservative	Stuart Russell	15,299	41.1	
Liberal	Herbert Samuel	14,135	38.0	
Labour	Frances Kerby	7,778	20.9	
Majority		1,164	3.1	N/A
Turnout		37,212	89.9	
Conservative gain from Liberal		Swing		

== Candidates ==
- The Conservatives chose Stanley Prescott to defend the seat.
- The Liberal Party prospective candidate was Philip Rea, who had been in place since 1939. However, the local Liberal Association decided not to contest the by-election. During World War II, the major parties had agreed an electoral pact under which they would not contest by-elections in seats held by their respective parties, and as a result many wartime by-elections resulting in a candidate being returned unopposed. However, other parties and independent politicians were free to field candidates, and, at Darwen, Honor Balfour stood as an "Independent Liberal". She was a university graduate, working as a journalist in London, and was a member of the Liberal Party National Executive. She was a known opponent of the electoral truce, and was prominent in the Liberal Action Group. She had spoken in support of the Independent Liberal candidate Donald Johnson at the 1943 Chippenham by-election. She resigned her Liberal Party membership in order to contest the election.
- The prospective Labour Party candidate, Ronald Haines, who had been in place since 1939 chose not to stand.

== Campaign ==
Balfour was encouraged to stand by the Liberal Party 'Radical Action' group that believed in contesting by-elections and had achieved a good result at the 1943 Chippenham by-election. There was some concern in the Liberal Party that the leadership would want to continue in an all-party Coalition Government after the war was over. However, the group was small and was unable to influence many party workers to give their support to her campaign. The executive of the Darwen Liberal Association decided to give her strong support to Honor Balfour's Independent Liberal candidature. However the President of the Association, Sir Frederick Hindle who had been the Liberal MP for the constituency in the 1920s, was one of the people who signed Russell's nomination papers. Finding himself at odds with his association, Hindle stood down as president. The decision of the Darwen Liberals didn't extend to providing Balfour with an election agent; she had to call upon a personal friend Mrs Ivor Davies to act as agent. Liberal leader Sir Archibald Sinclair, in accordance with the wartime electoral truce, signed a public letter of support for Russell. Balfour's campaign did receive some backing from Richard Acland's Common Wealth organisation. Balfour was backed by the News Chronicle, but only after the local newspapers had threatened to boycott her campaign altogether.

== Result ==
Prescott increased the Conservative share of the vote, albeit on a much-reduced turnout. However, Balfour came within 70 votes of winning the seat.

1943 Darwen by-election Electorate
Party	Candidate	Votes	%	±%
Conservative	Stanley Prescott	8,869	50.2	+9.1
Independent Liberal	Honor Balfour	8,799	49.8	New
Majority		70	0.4	−2.7
Turnout		17,668	45.0	−43.9
Conservative hold		Swing		

== Aftermath ==
Balfour published an article "Why I Challenge the Electoral Truce" in the magazine Liberal Forward which encouraged a large number of Liberal members to give their active support to the 'Independent' Liberal candidate at the 1944 Bury St Edmunds by-election. Balfour contested the 1945 election here as the official Liberal candidate, thereafter she did not stand again. Prescott held the seat until retiring in 1951. The result at the following General election;

1945 general election Electorate
Party	Candidate	Votes	%	±%
Conservative	Stanley Prescott	13,623	41.4	
Labour	Ronald Haines	11,282	34.3	
Liberal	Honor Balfour	7,979	24.3	
Majority		2,341	7.1	
Turnout		32,884	82.7	
Conservative hold		Swing		

== See also ==
- Darwen constituency
- List of United Kingdom by-elections

== Bibliography ==
- Liberal Crusader by Gerard De Groot
- Trial By Ballot by Ivor RM Davies
- By-Elections in British Politics by Cook and Ramsden
- Craig, F. W. S. (1983) [1969]. British parliamentary election results 1918-1949 (3rd ed.). Chichester: Parliamentary Research Services. ISBN 0-900178-06-X.
- Leigh Rayment's Historical List of MPs
