= Honor Balfour =

British politician and journalist

Honor Balfour

Honor Catherine Mary Balfour (4 August 1912 – 24 February 2001), was a British Liberal Party politician and journalist.

== Early life and education ==
Honor Balfour was born in Liverpool, England, in 1912, and attended Liverpool Institute High School for Girls at Blackburne House. Her father, a merchant seaman, was killed during the Great War, and Balfour was brought up by her widowed mother.

She studied for a year at Liverpool University, reading sociology, while earning money teaching music. She then won a scholarship to Oxford University, as a member of the Society of Oxford Home Students, a precursor of the first women's colleges, and St Anne's College, Oxford. Her mother came to live in Oxford with her.

== Career ==
After graduation, she began a career as a journalist, initially with the Oxford Mail, and then later in London.

She was parliamentary lobby correspondent for Time magazine from 1948 to 1969. She was one of the founding contributors to Picture Post from 1938 to 1957. She was also a BBC Radio broadcaster.

While living in London, she kept a cottage in the village of Swinbrook, then from 1972 in Windrush, where she retired in 1981.

== Political activity ==
Honor Balfour was President of the Oxford University Liberal Club in 1931, the first woman to hold such a role, and in 1937 stood as a Liberal candidate for Oxford City Council in a by-election in East ward. She had a straight fight with a Conservative and received some support from the local Labour Party. Although she lost comfortably, her campaign had set in motion co-operation between the local Liberal and Labour parties that resulted in a Popular Front candidature at the 1938 Oxford by-election. While living in Oxford, she assisted in setting up a home for Basque children, refugees from the Spanish Civil War. She was a member of the national Liberal Party Council. She then became a member of the Liberal Party National Executive.

In November 1941 she was a founding member of Liberal Action along with Sir Richard Acland, Donald Johnson, Ivor Davies, Lancelot Spicer and Everett Jones. She became the group's founding Secretary. The group sought to activate and energise the party at a time when much of the party was becoming dormant due to the wartime electoral truce. The group subsequently changed its name to Radical Action and became associated with Liberal candidates who wanted to break the wartime electoral truce by standing as Independent Liberals at by-elections. There was some concern in the Liberal Party that the leadership would want to continue in an all-party Coalition Government after the war was over. She spoke in support of the Independent Liberal candidate Donald Johnson at the 1943 Chippenham by-election. In 1943, Honor Balfour temporarily resigned her membership of the Liberal Party to stand as an Independent Liberal in the 1943 Darwen by-election. This was to avoid a breach of the agreement between the major parties that they would not contest by-elections against each other during the Second World War. The outcome of the election, which was a two-horse race, was that she almost defeated the Conservative candidate, Stanley Prescott, failing by only 70 votes;

Darwen by-election, 1943 Electorate
Party	Candidate	Votes	%	±%
Conservative	William Robert Stanley Prescott	8,869	50.2	+9.1
Independent Liberal	Honor Balfour	8,799	49.8	N/A
Majority		70	0.4	−2.7
Turnout		17,668	45.0	−43.9
Conservative hold		Swing		

Balfour published an article Why I Challenge the Electoral Truce in the magazine Liberal Forward which encouraged a large number of Liberal members to give their active support to Margery Corbett Ashby the Independent Liberal candidate at the 1944 Bury St Edmunds by-election. She went on to fight the Darwen constituency again at the 1945 general election, this time as a Liberal Party candidate, but came third, gaining just under a quarter of the votes.

1945 General Election: Darwen Electorate
Party	Candidate	Votes	%	±%
Conservative	William Robert Stanley Prescott	13,623	41.4	
Labour	Ronald Haines	11,282	34.3	
Liberal	Honor Balfour	7,979	24.3	
Majority		2,341	7.1	
Turnout			82.7	
Conservative hold		Swing		

After this her activity for the Liberal party fell away and she did not contest any further parliamentary elections. In 1957 she criticised the Liberal Party choice of candidate for the 1957 Carmarthen by-election. The local association had adopted a candidate who supported Prime Minister Anthony Eden's actions over Suez. The new Liberal Party leader Jo Grimond was opposed to Eden's actions as were the majority of the Liberal party. Balfour believed that the party should disown the Carmarthen candidate. When Liberal party HQ decided to back the Carmarthen candidate, Balfour resigned from the party in protest.
