= Sanderson baronets of Malling Deanery (1920) =

Baronetcy in the Baronetage of the United Kingdom

Escutcheon of the Sanderson baronets of Malling Deanery

The Sanderson baronetcy, of Malling Deanery in South Malling in the County of Sussex, was created in the Baronetage of the United Kingdom on 26 June 1920 for the businessman, politician and public servant Frank Sanderson. He was Member of Parliament for Darwen, Ealing and East Ealing.

== Sanderson baronets, of Malling Deanery (1920) ==
- Sir Frank Bernard Sanderson, 1st Baronet (1880–1965)
- Sir (Frank Philip) Bryan Sanderson, 2nd Baronet (1910–1992)
- Sir Frank Sanderson, 3rd Baronet (1933–2023)
- Sir David Frank Sanderson, 4th Baronet (born 1962)

The heir presumptive is the present holder's brother, Michael John Sanderson (born 1965).
