= Sir Frank =

Sir Frank may refer to any knight with first name of Frank:

- Sir Frank Forbes Adam, 1st Baronet
- Sir Frank Alexander, 1st Baronet
- Sir Frank Atherton
- Sir Frank Baines
- Sir Frank Beauchamp, 1st Baronet
- Sir Frank Bowater, 1st Baronet
- Sir Frank Bowden, 1st Baronet
- Sir Frank Brangwyn
- Sir Frank Macfarlane Burnet, OM, AK, KBE
- Sir Frank Clarke
- Sir Frank Crisp, 1st Baronet
- Sir Frank Fraser Darling
- Sir Frank Dicksee
- Sir Frank Gavan Duffy
- Sir Frank Dyson
- Sir Frank Fox
- Sir Frank Francis
- Sir Frank Walter Goldstone
- Sir Frank Gordon
- Sir Frank Green, 1st Baronet
- Sir Frank Cyril Hawker
- Sir Frank Wild Holdsworth, FRCS
- Sir Frank Hollins, 3rd Baronet
- Sir Frank Kermode
- Sir Frank Lampl
- Sir Frank Lascelles
- Sir Frank Godbould Lee
- Sir Frank Lockwood
- Sir Frank Lowe (advertiser) (1941-), British advertiser
- Sir Frank Lowy (1930-), Slovak born Australian businessman
- Sir Frank Crossley Mappin
- Sir Frank Markham Community School
- Sir Frank Mears
- Sir Frank Messervy
- Sir Frank Meyer, 2nd Baronet
- Sir Frank Mitchell
- Sir Frank Nelson
- Sir Frank Newnes, 2nd Baronet
- Sir Frank Newsam
- Sir Frank Nicklin
- Sir Frank Packer
- Sir Frank Price
- Sir Frank Ree
- Sir Frank Sanderson, 1st Baronet
- Sir Frank Sanderson, 3rd Baronet
- Sir Frank Short
- Sir Frank Soskice
- Sir Frank Ewart Smith
- Sir Frank Stenton
- Sir Frank Swettenham
- Sir Frank Leslie Walcott
- Sir Frank Whittle
- Sir Frank Williams
- Sir Frank William Wills
- Sir Frank Worrell (1924-1967), Barbadian cricketer

== See also ==
- Frank (given name)
- Frank (surname)
- Sir Frankie Crisp
- Sir Franklin
