= 1903 Rochester by-election =

United Kingdom parliamentary election

- 22 September 1903

Candidate	Tuff	Johnston
Party	Conservative	Liberal
Popular vote	2,504	1,983
Percentage	55.8%	44.2%
MP before election
Viscount Cranborne
Conservative
Subsequent MP
Samuel Ridley
Conservative

The 1903 Rochester by-election was a Parliamentary by-election held on 23 September 1903. The constituency returned one Member of Parliament (MP) to the House of Commons of the United Kingdom, elected by the first past the post voting system.

== Vacancy ==
The vacancy was caused when the borough's Conservative Member of Parliament (MP) James Gascoyne-Cecil, known by his courtesy title as Viscount Cranborne, succeeded to the peerage on 22 August 1903. He had been MP for Darwen from 1885 to 1892, and then for Rochester since winning the seat at a by-election in 1893.

== Electoral history ==
Cranborne had been returned unopposed at the 1900 general election, so the borough had not seen a contested parliamentary election since 1895.

== Candidates ==
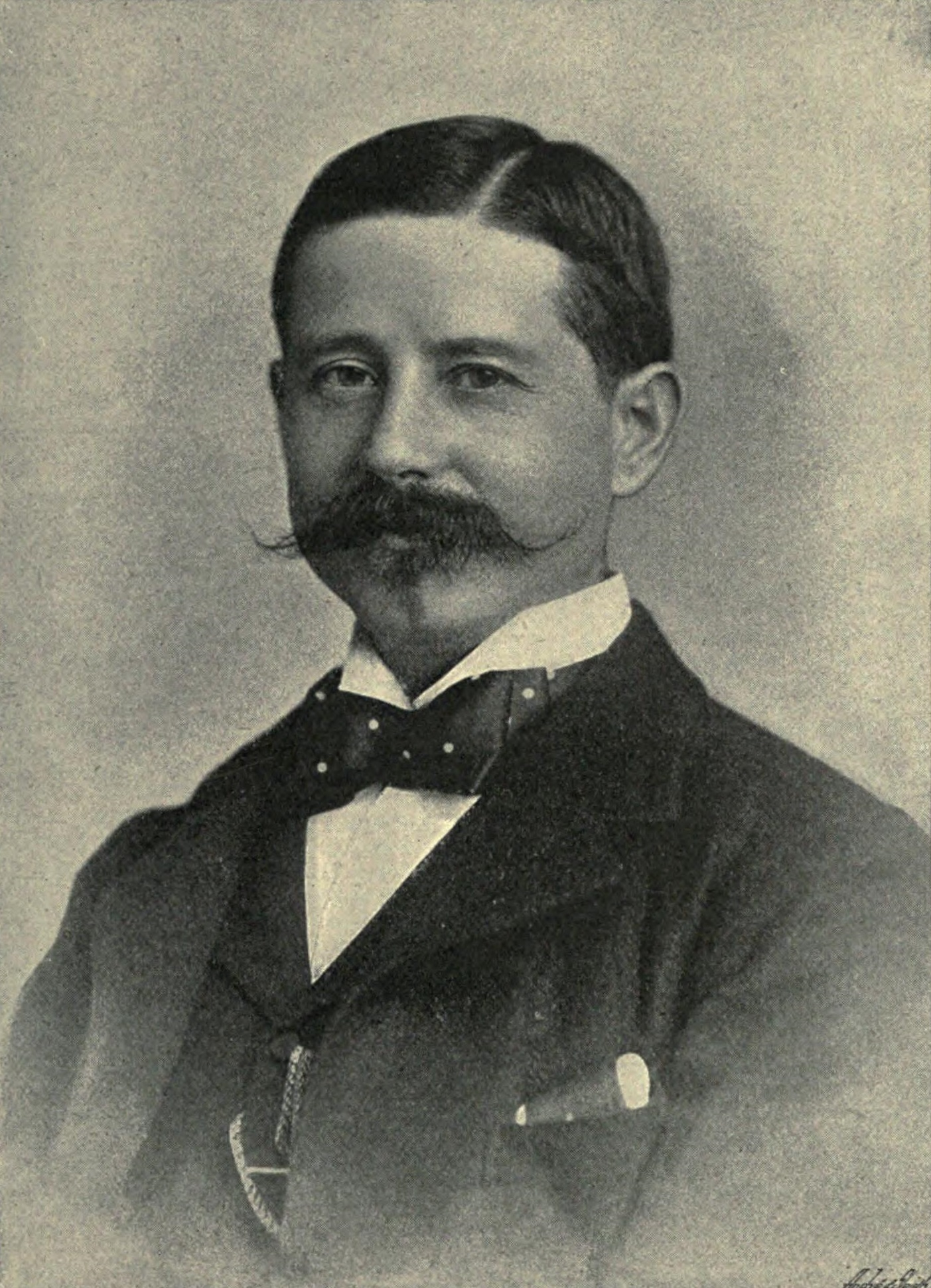
Sir Harry Johnston

The two major parties chose their candidates on 2 September. The Unionists (the Conservatives and their Liberal Unionist allies) chose Charles Tuff, the owner of a large firm of contractors. He had been mayor of Rochester from 1900 to 1902.

The Liberal Party selected as its candidate Sir Harry Johnston, an African explorer and colonial administrator.

The writ for the by-election was received on 15 September by the mayor, who fixed 18 September as the closing day for nominations, and Wednesday 23 September as polling day. No independent or minor party candidates were nominated, so the election was a two-way contest between Tuff and Johnston.

== Campaign ==
The Liberals were disappointed that the election was called so soon after the vacancy occurred, because they believed that a longer campaign would help their prospects. Both candidates had issued the election address by 9 September, along with a lot of supporting literature. The two parties hoped to canvass all the borough's electors, but acknowledged that the shortness of the campaign made this target unlikely. The Unionists were reported by The Times newspaper to have a "near-perfect" organisation in Rochester.

The main issue in the campaign was tariff reform, over which the Liberal Unionist minister Joseph Chamberlain had recently resigned from the cabinet to campaign for Imperial Preference. The Liberals also focused on the conduct of the Second Boer War.

In the first full week of the campaign, the Unionists decided not to hold a large public meeting, but rather to hold five smaller meetings in different parts of the borough. Speakers were to include Sir William Hart Dyke MP and Horatio Davies MP.

The Liberals held the biggest meeting, at the Corn Exchange, but otherwise the meetings organised by the Unionists were better attended. A major theme in the campaign was the question of free trade; Edmund Robertson MP spoke at a Liberal meeting to say that the issue was simply one of taxing food: would the tariffs on food be renewed? Johnston sent a "personal note" to Unionist supporters condemning the Unionist government's handling of the Boer War, and accusing them of deliberately throwing away the lives of British soldiers. He called on any Unionists who saw themselves as patriots to abstain rather than elect a supporter of such a government. Extensive canvassing took place on Saturday 19 September, after which both parties reported that the outcome would likely depend on the Labour vote.

Both the Tariff Reform League and the Free Trade Association distributed large numbers of leaflets and cartoons, and the Licensed Victuallers Association was actively organising in support of the Unionists.

The costs incurred by the two candidates were reported in The Times in November 1903: Tuff's campaign had spent £559 18s 5d, and Johnston's campaign had spent £636 4s. 4d.

== Result ==
The Conservative Party held the seat.

Rochester by-election, 1903
Party	Candidate	Votes	%	±%
Conservative	Charles Tuff	2,504	55.8	N/A
Liberal	Harry Johnston	1,983	44.2	New
Majority		521	11.6	N/A
Turnout		4,487	86.2	N/A
Conservative hold		Swing		
