= Huntington baronets =

Extinct baronetcy in the Baronetage of the United Kingdom

- Escutcheon of the Huntington baronets of Clock House
- Creation date: 1906
- Status: extinct
- Extinction date: 1928
- Seats: The Clock House, 8 Chelsea Embankment
- Motto: Acta non verba, Deeds, not words

The Huntington Baronetcy, of Clock House in the Metropolitan Borough of Chelsea, was a title in the Baronetage of the United Kingdom. It was created on 20 July 1906 for Charles Huntington, previously Liberal Member of Parliament for Darwen. The title became extinct on the death of the third Baronet in 1928.

== Huntington baronets, of Clock House (1906) ==
- Sir Charles Philip Huntington, 1st Baronet (1833–1906)
- Sir Henry Leslie Huntington, 2nd Baronet (1885–1907)
- Sir Charles Philip Huntington, 3rd Baronet (1888–1928). He left no heir.

== Notes ==
Baronetage of the United Kingdom
Preceded by Greenwell baronets	Huntington baronets of Clock House; 20 July 1906	Succeeded by Langman baronets
