= Frank Tuff =

English cricketer

Personal information
- Full name: Frank Noel Tuff
- Born: 26 November 1889; Rochester, Kent, England
- Died: 5 November 1915 (aged 25); Imtarfa, Malta
- Batting: Right-handed
- Bowling: Right-arm medium-fast

Domestic team information
- Years: Team
- 1910–1911: Oxford University

Career statistics
Competition	First-class
Matches	11
Runs scored	188
Batting average	14.46
100s/50s	–/–
Top score	35
Balls bowled	1,359
Wickets	25
Bowling average	26.80
5 wickets in innings	2
10 wickets in match	–
Best bowling	7/47
Catches/stumpings	6/–
- Source: Cricinfo, 2 June 2019

Frank Noel Tuff (26 November 1889 – 5 November 1915) was an English first-class cricketer. The son of a Conservative Party Member of Parliament, Tuff played first-class cricket for Oxford University and the Free Foresters, before serving in the First World War, in which he was killed from wounds sustained during a bomb accident while taking part in the Gallipoli Campaign.

== Life, cricket and WWI service ==
Tuff was born at Rochester, Kent in November 1889, the son of Charles Tuff and his wife, Mary Ann Tuff. He was educated at the Abbey School in Beckenham, before going up to Malvern College, where he played for the college cricket team for three years. From Malvern he went up to Brasenose College, Oxford, where he studied law. While studying at Oxford he made his debut in first-class cricket for Oxford University against the Gentlemen of England at Oxford in 1910. He made eight further first-class appearances for Oxford University across the 1910 and 1911 seasons, scoring 128 runs with a high score of 34 not out, while with his right-arm medium-fast bowling he took 18 wickets at an average of 30.55, with best figures of 5 for 28. Tuff also represented the combined Oxford and Cambridge Universities cricket team in a first-class match against a combined Army and Navy cricket team at Aldershot in 1910, in which he also took a five wicket haul with figures of 7 for 47 in the Army and Navy first-innings. He gained a blue in 1910. In addition to playing cricket for the university, he also played football for Oxford University A.F.C. and Corinthians. He married Muriel Mary Smith in 1912. He made a final appearance in first-class cricket for the Free Foresters against Oxford University in 1914.

Tuff served in the British Army during World War I, enlisting with the Royal East Kent Mounted Rifles as a second lieutenant in June 1915. He saw action during the Gallipoli campaign and was seriously wounded in a bomb accident at Cape Helles. He was evacuated to Malta, where he died from his wounds on 5 November 1915. He was buried at the Pietà Military Cemetery. A memorial to him survives in Saint Margaret's Cemetery, Rochester, Kent. It reads 'In memory of Frank Noel Tuff, 2nd Lieut Royal East Kent Mounted Rifles, the dearly loved youngest son of Charles and Marian Tuff and devoted husband of Murial Mary Tuff. Who died at Malta on 5 November 1915 from wounds received on 23 October 1915 in the Dardanelles. Born 26 November 1889. R.I.P.'

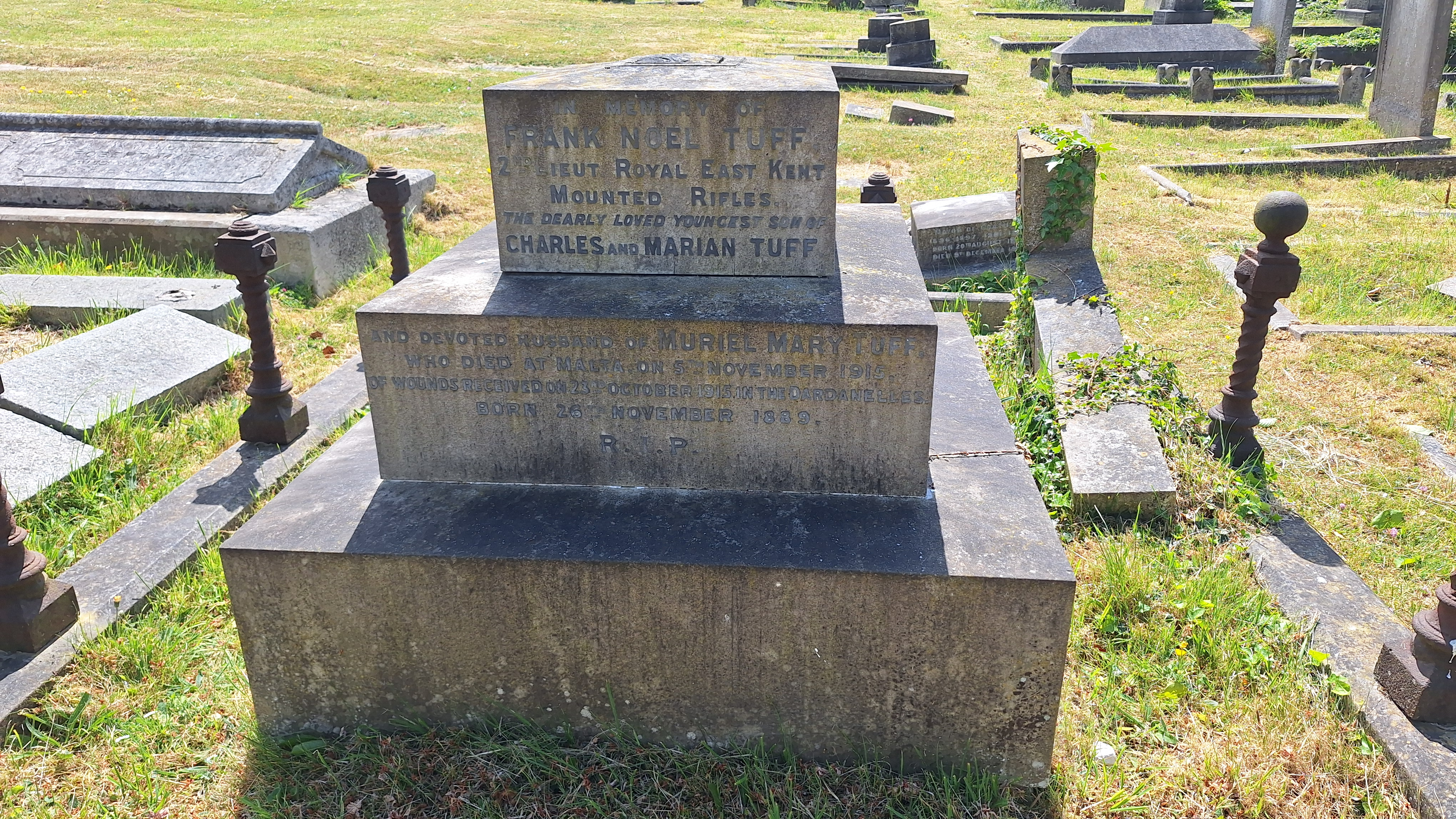
