= Charles Tuff =

British businessman and politician (1855–1929)

Charles Tuff (4 September 1855 – 27 January 1929) was a British businessman and Conservative Party politician from the town of Rochester in Kent. He sat in the House of Commons from 1903 to 1906.

Tuff was the son of Henry Tuff from Rochester, and the grandson of Mary Tuff, a wealthy lime-burner from nearby Borstal He was born in Plumstead, but spent nearly all his life in Rochester. He was the head of several large firm of merchants and contractors, including a large fleet of barges on the River Medway. He was mayor of Rochester from 1900 to 1902, having been long involved in local politics, chairing a local Conservative ward committee.

In August 1903 the Conservative member of parliament (MP) for the borough of Rochester, Viscount Cranborne succeeded to the peerage as Marquess of Salisbury, and was therefore elevated to the House of Lords, creating a vacancy in the Commons. On 3 September Tuff was adopted as the Unionist candidate for the resulting by-election by the Rochester Liberal Unionist association and the Rochester Constitutional Association. He held the seat with a majority of 11.6% over his only opponent, the Liberal Party candidate Sir Harry Johnston.

However, he was defeated at the 1906 general election by the Liberal candidate Ernest Henry Lamb, and did not stand again.

Tuff was also a justice of the peace (J.P.) for Rochester and for Kent.

He died aged 74 on 27 January 1929, at his home Westfield, Singlewell, Gravesend. Two of his four sons were killed in World War I, including Frank Tuff, who was a first-class cricketer.

Parliament of the United Kingdom
Preceded by Viscount Cranborne	Member of Parliament for Rochester; 1903 – 1906	Succeeded by Ernest Lamb
