= Frederick Hindle (politician, born 1848) =

British politician & solicitor (1848-1925)

Major Frederick George Hindle
- Hindle in 1906

Member of Parliament for Darwen
- In office Jan 1910 – Dec 1910
- Preceded by: John Rutherford
- Succeeded by: John Rutherford

Personal details
- Born: 15 January 1848
- Died: 1 March 1925 (aged 77)
- Party: Liberal Party
- Spouse: Helen Moulden Gillibrand (m. 1876)
- Parents: John Hindle (father); Alice Chadwick (mother)
- Relatives: Frederick Hindle, jr. (son)
- Education: Blackburn Grammar School
- Military career
- Allegiance: United Kingdom
- Branch: British Army
- Rank: Major
- Unit: East Lancashire Volunteers

Maj. Frederick George Hindle (15 January 1848 – 1 March 1925) was a solicitor and Liberal Party politician in the United Kingdom, who served as Member of Parliament (MP) for the Darwen constituency in Lancashire from January 1910 to December 1910.

== Background ==
Hindle was the son of John Hindle and Alice Chadwick. He was educated at Blackburn Grammar School. Senior Prizeman at Examination as Solicitor in 1870. In 1876 he married Helen Moulden Gillibrand. They had one son, Frederick Hindle, jun., who was also Liberal MP for Darwen.

== Professional career ==
Hindle served 19 years as an officer in the East Lancashire Volunteers and retired with rank of Major. He practised as a solicitor in Manchester and at Darwen. From 1882 he was Clerk to Darwen Borough Justices. In 1883 he had published 'The Legal Status of Licensed Victuallers'.

== Political career ==
Hindle was Liberal candidate for the Darwen division of Lancashire at the 1906 General Election missing out by 25 votes. He was Liberal candidate again at the January 1910 election and this time won by 211 votes. At the December election he lost by 215 votes. He was re-selected to contest Darwen for the Liberals for a general election expected to take place in 1915. However, due to the outbreak of war, the election was postponed until 1918. By then he had been replaced as Liberal candidate by his son. He did not stand for parliament again.

=== Electoral record ===
General election 1906: Darwen
Party	Candidate	Votes	%	±%
Conservative	John Rutherford	7,792	50.1	−1.6
Liberal	Frederick Hindle	7,767	49.9	+1.6
Majority		25	0.2	−3.2
Turnout		15,559	94.0	+2.6
Registered electors		16,544		
Conservative hold		Swing	-1.6	

General election January 1910: Darwen
Party	Candidate	Votes	%	±%
Liberal	Frederick Hindle	8,639	50.6	+0.7
Conservative	John Rutherford	8,428	49.4	−0.7
Majority		211	1.2	n/a
Turnout		17,067	96.2	+2.2
Registered electors		17,734		
Liberal gain from Conservative		Swing	+0.7	

General election December 1910
Party	Candidate	Votes	%	±%
Conservative	John Rutherford	8,384	50.6	+1.2
Liberal	Frederick Hindle	8,169	49.4	−1.2
Majority		215	1.2	n/a
Turnout		16,553	93.3	−2.9
Registered electors		17,734		
Conservative gain from Liberal		Swing	+1.2	

Parliament of the United Kingdom
Preceded by John Rutherford	Member of Parliament for Darwen; January 1910–December 1910	Succeeded by John Rutherford
