= Radical Action =

Radical Action was a political group within the British Liberal Party. It advocated for Liberal candidates to stand in elections despite the war-time electoral pact.

The organisation was founded in 1941 as the Liberal Action Group. It included some prominent members of the Liberal Party who disagreed with the war-time electoral pact in which the Liberals, Conservative Party and Labour Party agreed not to stand candidates against each other. Initially, its leading figures were Lancelot Spicer, Honor Balfour and Everett Jones, while Philip Fothergill became treasurer and Donald Johnson was the first chairman.

The group supported a wide range of policies; it was more radical and less libertarian than much of the Liberal Party and accepted the need for government intervention. It strongly opposed the National Liberal Party and any possible merger with it, and called for more internal party democracy, new party structures to revitalise the party, and for the party to stand as many candidates as possible at the next general election.

By 1943 the group had the support of 23 Liberal Prospective Parliamentary Candidates. Johnson resigned from the Liberal Party to stand unsuccessfully in the 1943 Chippenham by-election and was replaced by Spicer as chairman, then Balfour followed suit and only lost the 1943 Darwen by-election by 70 votes. The group endorsed Margery Corbett Ashby as an independent Liberal at the 1944 Bury St Edmunds by-election. Support for the group only increased within the party, with five MPs joining, including Megan Lloyd George, Clement Davies, and newly elected William Beveridge.

The group dissolved in 1945 after World War II ended and the electoral pact was discontinued. Several former members assumed leading positions in the party; Davies became leader, Fothergill treasurer, and Lloyd George was later appointed as deputy leader.
