= John Bowle (historian) =

English historian and writer

John Edward Bowle (19 December 1905 – 17 September 1985) was an English historian and writer.

== Education ==
He was educated at Marlborough College. There his contemporaries included John Betjeman, who became a friend, and Anthony Blunt, about whom he was consistently negative. He was an undergraduate at Balliol College, Oxford, where he was counted as an Aesthete. Bowle left Oxford with a Third in Modern History, 1927.

== Career ==
After his education, Bowle became a teacher, at Westminster School and Eton College. He had worked briefly for Horace Plunkett, a position he had pushed Betjeman out of (1929).

During World War II, he worked for the Air Ministry and the Foreign Office, and later took to writing books about British history. He became a lecturer at Wadham College, Oxford, 1947-49.

He then took up an appointment in 1949 as Director of the Preparatory Session of the College of Europe at Bruges, where from 1950 to 1967, he became Professor of Political Theory. He became a visiting professor at Columbia University. New York City, Grinnell College, Iowa, the Occidental College in Los Angeles, and Indiana University.

In 1968 he was visiting lecturer at Smith College, Massachusetts.

== Bibliography ==
- Western Political Thought: An Historical Introduction from the Origins to Rousseau (1947)
- The Unity of European History (1948)
- Hobbes and His Critics (1951)
- Politics and Opinion in the Nineteenth Century (1954)
- Viscount Samuel. A Biography (1957)
- The Concise Encyclopædia of World History (1958) editor
- A New Outline Of World History (1963)
- Henry VIII (1964)
- England, A Portrait (1966)
- The English Experience: A Survey of English History from Early to Modern Times (1971)
- The Imperial Achievement: The Rise and Transformation of the British Empire (1974)
- Charles the First (1975)
- The Concise Encyclopedia of World History (1975; editor)
- Man through the Ages (1977)
- John Evelyn and His World: A Biography (1981)
