= Sir Charles Huntington, 1st Baronet =

British industrialist and politician (c. 1833 – 1906)

Sir Charles Philip Huntington, 1st Baronet (c. 1833 – 23 December 1906) was a British industrialist and member of parliament.

Charles moved with his two brothers to work in the wallpaper industry in Darwen, Lancashire and eventually became a Director of Wallpaper Manufacturers Ltd., who sold the Walpamur range of products.

He was appointed a justice of the peace in 1878 and elected the Liberal MP for Darwen in 1892, sitting until 1895. He was chosen Mayor of Darwen for 1897–98.

He was made 1st Baronet Huntington of the Clock House, Chelsea on 28 June 1906 but died there soon afterwards in January 1907. He had married June Hudson Sparkes of Merton, Surrey, with whom he had several children, and was succeeded in the baronetcy by two of his sons in turn, Henry Leslie (1885–1907) and Charles Philip (1888–1928), after which the baronetcy became extinct. His daughter Marguerite married Cecil Norton, 1st Baron Rathcreedan, MP.

== Sources ==
- "Crown Paint-Brushstrokes of History" (PDF).

Parliament of the United Kingdom
Preceded by The Viscount Cranborne	Member of Parliament for Darwen; 1892–1895	Succeeded by John Rutherford
Baronetage of the United Kingdom
New creation	Baronet (of Clock House); 1906	Succeeded by Henry Leslie Huntington
