= James Gascoyne-Cecil, 4th Marquess of Salisbury =

British politician (1861–1947)

The Most Honourable The Marquess of Salisbury KG GCVO CB PC
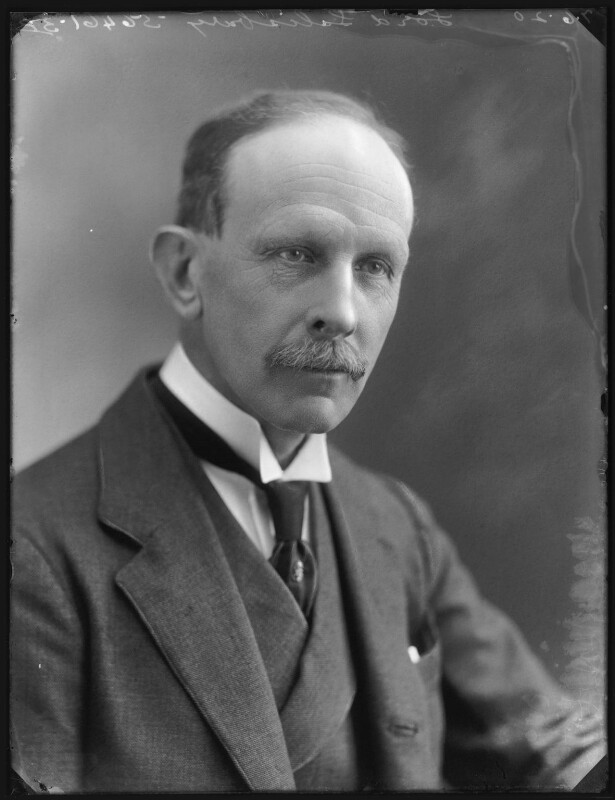
- Lord Salisbury in 1920

Leader of the House of Lords
- In office 27 April 1925 – 4 June 1929
- Monarch: George V
- Prime Minister: Stanley Baldwin
- Preceded by: The Marquess Curzon of Kedleston
- Succeeded by: The Lord Parmoor
Other ministerial offices
Lord Keeper of the Privy Seal
In office 6 November 1924 – 4 June 1929
Monarch	George V
Prime Minister	Stanley Baldwin
Preceded by	John Robert Clynes
Succeeded by	James Henry Thomas
In office 17 October 1903 – 4 December 1905
Monarch	Edward VII
Prime Minister	The Marquess of Salisbury (his father); Arthur Balfour
Preceded by	Arthur Balfour
Succeeded by	The Marquess of Ripon
Lord President of the Council
In office 24 October 1922 – 22 January 1924
Monarch	George V
Prime Minister	Bonar Law; Stanley Baldwin
Preceded by	Arthur Balfour
Succeeded by	The Lord Parmoor
Chancellor of the Duchy of Lancaster
In office 24 October 1922 – 25 May 1923
Monarch	George V
Prime Minister	Bonar Law; Stanley Baldwin
Preceded by	Sir William Sutherland
Succeeded by	J. C. C. Davidson
President of the Board of Trade
In office 12 March 1905 – 4 December 1905
Monarch	Edward VII
Prime Minister	Arthur Balfour
Preceded by	Gerald Balfour
Succeeded by	David Lloyd George
Parliamentary Under-Secretary of State for Foreign Affairs
In office 12 November 1900 – 9 October 1903
Monarchs	Victoria; Edward VII
Prime Minister	The Marquess of Salisbury; Arthur Balfour
Preceded by	The Earl Midleton
Succeeded by	The Earl Percy

Member of the House of Lords Lord Temporal
- In office 22 August 1903 – 4 April 1947; Hereditary peerage
- Preceded by: The 3rd Marquess of Salisbury
- Succeeded by: The 5th Marquess of Salisbury

Member of Parliament for Rochester
- In office 8 February 1893 – 22 August 1903
- Preceded by: Horatio Davies
- Succeeded by: Charles Tuff

Member of Parliament for Darwen
- In office 18 December 1885 – 26 July 1892
- Preceded by: Constituency created
- Succeeded by: Sir Charles Huntington

Personal details
- Born: 23 October 1861 London, United Kingdom
- Died: 4 April 1947 (aged 85) London, United Kingdom
- Party: Conservative
- Spouse(s): Lady Cicely Gore (1867–1955)
- Children: Beatrice; Robert Gascoyne-Cecil, 5th Marquess of Salisbury; Mary; David
- Parents: Robert Gascoyne-Cecil, 3rd Marquess of Salisbury; Georgina Alderson
- Education: University College, Oxford

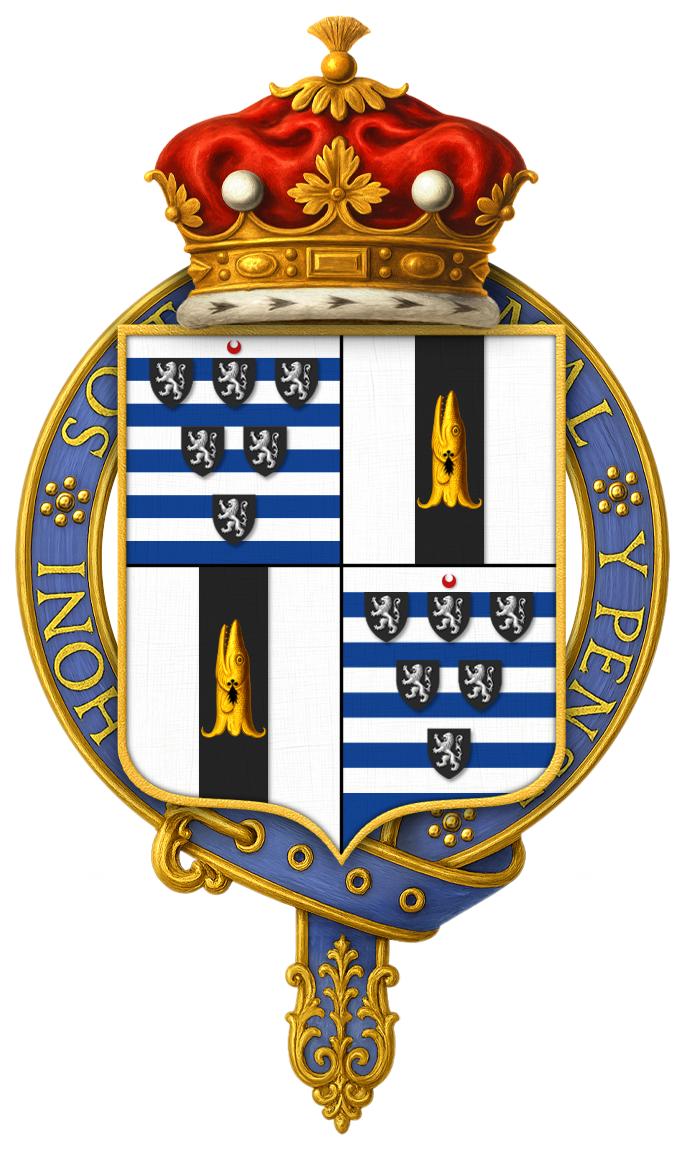
Garter-encircled arms of James Gascoyne-Cecil, 4th Marquess of Salisbury, KG, GCVO, CB, PC

James Edward Hubert Gascoyne-Cecil, 4th Marquess of Salisbury, (23 October 1861 – 4 April 1947), known as Viscount Cranborne from 1868 to 1903, was a British politician.

== Background and education ==
Born in London, Salisbury was the eldest son of Robert Gascoyne-Cecil, 3rd Marquess of Salisbury, who served as British Prime Minister, by his wife Georgina (née Alderson). The Right Reverend Lord William Cecil, Lord Cecil of Chelwood and Lord Quickswood were his younger brothers, and Prime Minister Arthur Balfour his first cousin. He was educated at Eton and University College, Oxford, graduating BA in 1885.

== Political career ==
As a teenager he accompanied his father to the 1876–1877 Constantinople Conference and a year later to the Congress of Berlin.

Lord Cranborne sat as Conservative Member of Parliament for Darwen, then called North-East Lancashire, from 1885 to 1892. He lost his seat at the general election of the latter year. He was elected for Rochester at a by-election in 1893, continuing as MP there until 1903, when he succeeded his father and was elevated to the House of Lords.

On 29 October 1892, Lord Cranborne was appointed lieutenant-colonel of the 4th (Militia) Battalion, Bedfordshire Regiment, (formerly the Hertfordshire Militia) of which his father was Honorary Colonel and was in command when the battalion saw active service in South Africa from March to November 1900, during the Second Boer War. The battalion, numbering 24 officers and 483 men, left Queenstown on 27 February in the transport Goorkha, with Lord Cranborne as the senior officer in command, arriving in Cape Town the following month. He received the Queen's South Africa Medal and was appointed a Companion of the Order of the Bath (CB) for his service during the war. In July 1902 he received the Honorary Freedom of the borough of Hertford in recognition of his service during the war. He was still in command of the battalion on the outbreak of World War I. He was also Colonel of the wartime Hertfordshire Volunteer Regiment and Hon Col of the 4th Battalion, Essex Regiment, of the Territorial Force. Lord Salisbury was ADC to Edward VII, and George V until 1929.

He served under his father and then his cousin Arthur Balfour as Parliamentary Under-Secretary of State for Foreign Affairs from 1900 to 1903, under Balfour as Lord Privy Seal from 1903 to 1905, and as President of the Board of Trade in 1905. In 1903 he was sworn of the Privy Council. In December 1908, he was appointed a deputy lieutenant of Hertfordshire. From 1906, following his uncle, he served as Chairman of the Canterbury House of Laymen.

Salisbury played a leading role in opposing David Lloyd George's People's Budget and the Parliament Bill of 1911. He commanded the 61st (2nd South Midland) Division in the UK from September 1915 to December 1916. He continued as a committed and eager member of the Territorial Army: he was Honorary Colonel of 86th (East Anglian) (Hertfordshire Yeomanry) Field Regiment, Royal Artillery, and of 48th (South Midland) Divisional Engineers.

In 1917 he was made a Knight Companion of the Garter. He returned to the government in the 1920s and served under Bonar Law and Stanley Baldwin as Chancellor of the Duchy of Lancaster from 1922 to 1923, as Lord President of the Council from 1922 to 1924, as Lord Privy Seal from 1924 to 1929 and as Leader of the House of Lords from 1925 to 1929 in successive Conservative governments of Bonar Law and Baldwin. He resigned as leader of the Conservative peers in June 1931 and became one of the most prominent opponents of Indian Home Rule in the Lords, supporting the campaign waged in the House of Commons by Winston Churchill against the Home Rule legislation.

Salisbury was part of two parliamentary deputations which called on the Prime Minister, Stanley Baldwin, and the Chancellor of the Exchequer, Neville Chamberlain, in the autumn of 1936 to remonstrate with them about the slow pace of British rearmament in the face of the growing threat from Nazi Germany. The delegation was led by Sir Austen Chamberlain, a former Foreign Secretary and its most prominent speakers included Winston Churchill, Leo Amery and Roger Keyes. The Marquess of Salisbury was Lord High Steward at the coronation of King George VI and Queen Elizabeth in 1937.

== Marriage and children ==
Lord Salisbury married Lady Cicely Alice Gore (born 15 July 1867, died 5 February 1955), second daughter of Arthur Gore, 5th Earl of Arran, on 17 May 1887 at St. Margaret's Church, Westminster. Between 1907 and 1910 she served as a Lady of the Bedchamber to Queen Alexandra; additionally she was appointed an Officer of the Order of St John of Jerusalem, and as a Justice of the Peace for Hertfordshire.

The couple had four children:

- Lady Beatrice Edith Mildred Gascoyne-Cecil (born 10 August 1891, died 1980), married William Ormsby-Gore, 4th Baron Harlech.
- Robert Arthur James Gascoyne-Cecil, 5th Marquess of Salisbury (born 27 August 1893, died 23 February 1972).
- Lady Mary Alice Gascoyne-Cecil (born 29 July 1895, died 24 December 1988), married Edward Cavendish, 10th Duke of Devonshire.
- Lord Edward Christian David Gascoyne-Cecil, CH (known as Lord David Cecil) (born 9 April 1902, died 1 January 1986).

Lord Salisbury died in April 1947, at 85, and was succeeded by his eldest son, Robert. The Marchioness of Salisbury died in February 1955.

He was the grandfather of actor Jonathan Cecil by his youngest son, David.

== Ancestry ==
Ancestors of James Gascoyne-Cecil, 4th Marquess of Salisbury

8. James Cecil, 1st Marquess of Salisbury
4. James Cecil, 2nd Marquess of Salisbury
9. Lady Emily Hill
2. Robert Gascoyne-Cecil, 3rd Marquess of Salisbury
10. Wills Hill, 1st Marquess of Downshire
5. Frances Mary Gascoyne
11. Lady Margaretta FitzGerald
1. James Gascoyne-Cecil, 4th Marquess of Salisbury
12. Robert Alderson (1752–1833)
6. Sir Edward Hall Alderson, Baron Alderson
13. Elizabeth Hurry
3. Georgina Alderson
14. Rev Edward Drewe
7. Georgina Catherine Drewe
15. Antoinette Caroline Allen

Parliament of the United Kingdom
New constituency	Member of Parliament for Darwen; 1885–1892	Succeeded by Charles Philip Huntington
Preceded by Horatio Davies	Member of Parliament for Rochester; 1893–1903	Succeeded by Charles Tuff
Political offices
Preceded by Hon. St John Brodrick	Under-Secretary of State for Foreign Affairs; 1900–1903	Succeeded by Earl Percy
Preceded by Arthur Balfour	Lord Privy Seal; 1903–1905	Succeeded by The Marquess of Ripon
Preceded by Gerald Balfour	President of the Board of Trade; 1905	Succeeded by David Lloyd George
Preceded by Sir William Sutherland	Chancellor of the Duchy of Lancaster; 1922–1923	Succeeded by John Davidson
Preceded by Arthur Balfour	Lord President of the Council; 1922–1924	Succeeded by The Lord Parmoor
Preceded by John Robert Clynes	Lord Privy Seal; 1924–1929	Succeeded by James Henry Thomas
Preceded by The Marquess Curzon of Kedleston	Leader of the House of Lords; 1925–1929	Succeeded by The Lord Parmoor
Military offices
New title	GOC 61st (2nd South Midland) Division; 1915−1916	Succeeded by Richard Bannatine-Allason
Court offices
Vacant Title last held by The Viscount Hailsham	Lord High Steward; 1937	Vacant Title next held by The Viscount Cunningham of Hyndhope
Party political offices
Preceded by The Marquess Curzon of Kedleston	Leader of the Conservative Party in the House of Lords; 1925–1931	Succeeded by The Viscount Hailsham
Peerage of Great Britain
Preceded by Robert Gascoyne-Cecil	Marquess of Salisbury; 1903–1947	Succeeded by Robert Gascoyne-Cecil
Peerage of England
Preceded by Robert Gascoyne-Cecil	Baron Cecil (descended by acceleration); 1903–1941	Succeeded by Robert Gascoyne-Cecil
