= Langman baronets =

Extinct baronetcy in the Baronetage of the United Kingdom

Escutcheon of the Langman baronets of Eaton Square

The Langman baronetcy, of Eaton Square in the City of Westminster, was a title in the Baronetage of the United Kingdom. It was created on 21 July 1906 for the philanthropist Sir John Langman. The title became extinct on the death of the 3rd Baronet in 1985, leaving no male issue.

== Langman baronets, of Eaton Square (1906) ==
- Sir John Lawrence Langman, 1st Baronet (1846–1928)
- Sir Archibald Lawrence Langman, 2nd Baronet (1872–1949)
- Sir John Lyell Langman, 3rd Baronet (1912–1985)

Baronetage of the United Kingdom
Preceded by Huntington baronets	Langman baronets of Eaton Square; 21 July 1906	Succeeded by Runciman baronets
