= Frederick Hindle (politician, born 1877) =

British politician (1877–1953)

Sir Frederick Hindle
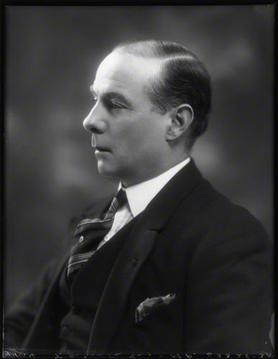
- Frederick Hindle

Member of Parliament for Darwen
- In office 1923–1924
- Preceded by: Sir Frank Sanderson
- Succeeded by: Sir Frank Sanderson

Personal details
- Born: 28 July 1877 Darwen, Lancashire, England
- Died: 23 April 1953 (aged 75)
- Party: Liberal Party
- Spouse: Alys Lawrence
- Parents: Frederick George Hindle (father); Helen Moulden Gillibrand (mother)
- Education: Charterhouse School; Owens College, Manchester

Sir Frederick Hindle (28 July 1877 – 23 April 1953) was a Liberal Party politician in the United Kingdom, who served as Member of Parliament (MP) for the Darwen constituency in Lancashire from 1923 to 1924.

== Background ==
Hindle was born in Darwen, the son of Frederick George Hindle and Helen Moulden (Gillibrand) Hindle. He was educated at Charterhouse School and Owens College, Manchester. He married Alys Lawrence.

== Political career ==
Hindle served as Mayor of Darwen from 1912 to 1913. He was appointed an Alderman Lancashire County Council. He succeeded his father as prospective Liberal candidate for Darwen. He contested the Darwen seat at the 1918 general election against his father's nemesis, Sir John Rutherford. At that election, Rutherford was endorsed by the Coalition Government and Hindle's prospects of victory were undercut by the intervention of a Labour Party candidate. Despite these setbacks, he came within 1,000 vote of gaining the seat. Four years later at the 1922 general election, he again lost by a majority of less than 1,000 votes. He won the seat at the 1923 general election, but lost it at the 1924 general election, and did not stand for Parliament again.

=== Electoral record ===
General election 1918: Darwen
Party	Candidate	Votes	%	±%
Unionist	Sir John Rutherford	9,014	40.5	−10.1
Liberal	Frederick Hindle	8,031	36.1	−13.3
Labour	John McGurk	5,211	23.4	n/a
Majority		983	4.4	+3.2
Turnout			71.3	−22.0
Unionist hold		Swing	+1.6	

General election 1922: Darwen
Party	Candidate	Votes	%	±%
Unionist	Frank Bernard Sanderson	12,218	42.6	+2.1
Liberal	Frederick Hindle	11,944	41.6	+5.5
Labour	John McGurk	4,528	15.8	−7.6
Majority		274	1.0	−3.4
Turnout			91.4	+20.1
Unionist hold		Swing	-1.7	

General election 1923: Darwen
Party	Candidate	Votes	%	±%
Liberal	Frederick Hindle	14,242	48.8	+7.2
Unionist	Frank Bernard Sanderson	11,432	39.1	−3.5
Labour	George Thompson	3,527	12.1	−6.1
Majority		2,810	9.7	10.7
Turnout			90.6	−0.8
Liberal gain from Unionist		Swing	+5.4	

General election 1924: Darwen
Party	Candidate	Votes	%	±%
Unionist	Sir Frank Bernard Sanderson	13,017	43.0	+3.9
Liberal	Frederick Hindle	12,082	39.9	−8.9
Labour	Thomas Ramsden	5,188	17.1	+5.0
Majority		935	3.1	12.8
Turnout			92.7	+2.1
Unionist gain from Liberal		Swing	+6.4	

Parliament of the United Kingdom
Preceded by Sir Frank Sanderson	Member of Parliament for Darwen; 1923–1924	Succeeded by Sir Frank Sanderson
