= The Future of Palestine =

1915 draft British Cabinet paper

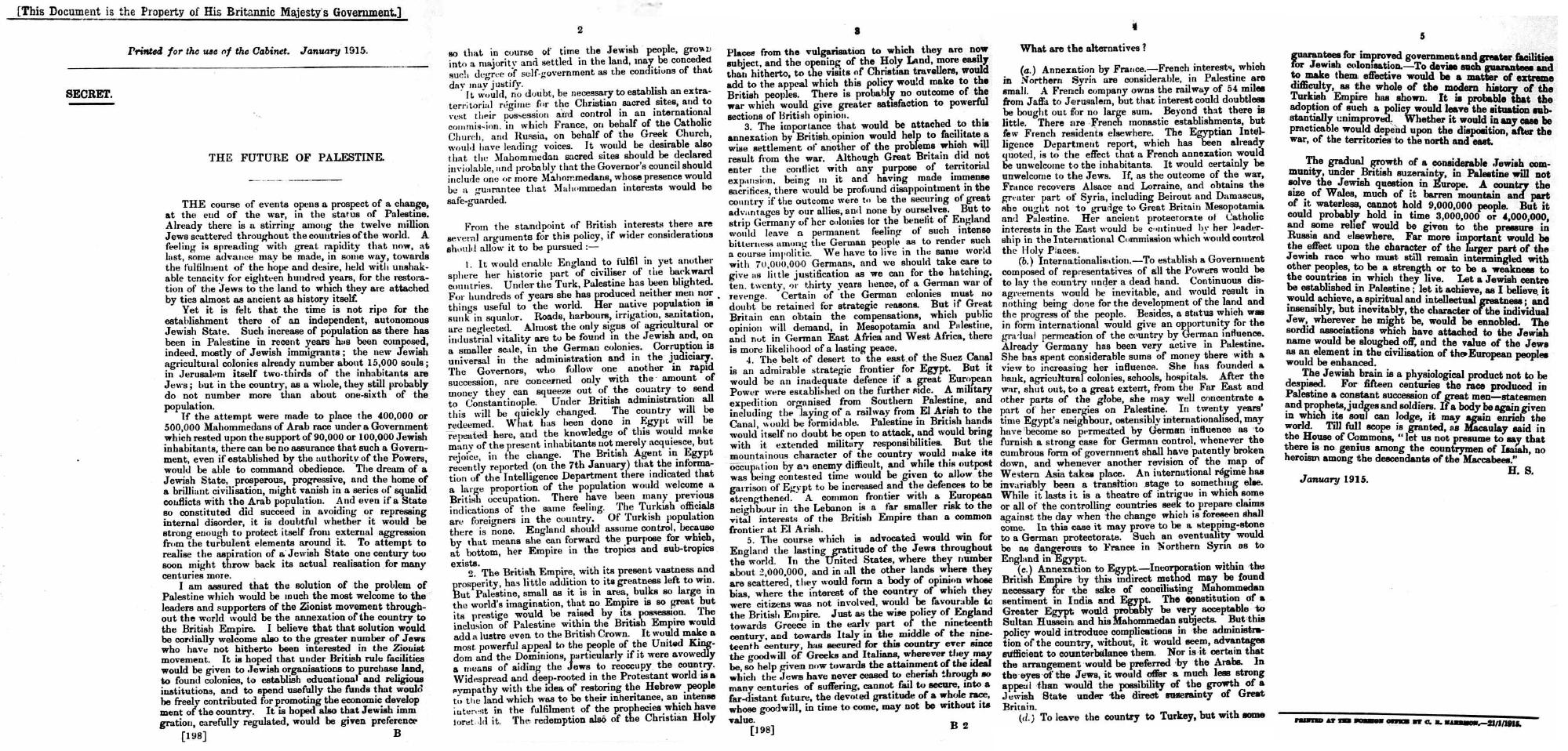
- The first draft of the memorandum as published in the British Cabinet papers (CAB 37/123/43), as at 21 January 1915
- Created: January–March 1915
- Author: Herbert Samuel
- Purpose: Advocate for incorporation of Palestine as British Protectorate in the British Empire

The Future of Palestine, also known as the Samuel memorandum, was a memorandum circulated by Herbert Samuel to the British Cabinet in January and March 1915, two months after the British declaration of war on the Ottoman Empire.

It was the first time in an official record that enlisting the support of Jews as a war measure was proposed.

== Background ==
Palestine was first discussed at British Cabinet level on 9 November 1914, four days after Britain's declaration of war on the Ottoman Empire. David Lloyd George, then Chancellor of the Exchequer "referred to the ultimate destiny of Palestine." Lloyd George's law firm Lloyd George, Roberts and Co had been engaged a decade before by the Zionist Federation of Great Britain and Ireland to work on the Uganda Scheme. In a discussion after the meeting with President of the Local Government Board Herbert Samuel, Lloyd George assured him that "he was very keen to see a Jewish state established in Palestine." Samuel then outlined the Zionist position more fully in a conversation with Foreign Secretary Edward Grey. He spoke of Zionist aspirations for the establishment in Palestine of a Jewish state, and of the importance of its geographical position to the British Empire. Samuel's memoirs state:

I mentioned that two things would be essential—that the state should be neutralized, since it could not be large enough to defend itself, and that the free access of Christian pilgrims should be guaranteed. ... I also said it would be a great advantage if the remainder of Syria were annexed by France, as it would be far better for the state to have a European power as neighbour than the Turk.

The same evening, Prime Minister H. H. Asquith announced that the dismemberment of the Ottoman Empire had become a war aim in a speech for the Lord Mayor's Banquet at the Mansion House, "It is the Ottoman Government, and not we who have rung the death knell of Ottoman dominion not only in Europe but in Asia."

== Cabinet level discussions ==
In December 1914 Samuel met Chaim Weizmann, who after the war was elected as the President of the World Zionist Organization, and later the first President of Israel. Samuel was then a member of the British Cabinet in his role as President of the Local Government Board. According to Weizmann's memoirs, Samuel was already an avid believer in Zionism, and believed that Weizmann's demands were too modest. Samuel did not want to enter into a detailed discussion of his plans, but mentioned that "perhaps the Temple may be rebuilt, as a symbol of Jewish unity, of course, in a modernised form".

A case study says that recollections of Josiah Wedgwood confirm those of David Lloyd George (supported by the National Archives) that the first meeting between Lloyd George and Weizmann was in August 1915 while noting that several sources refer to a meeting in December 1914 or January 1915. (According to Schneer, on 15 January 1915, Weizmann and Samuel met at 11 Downing Street with Lloyd George but sources that to Weizmann's Trial and Error which gives the date as 3 December 1914.) At the end of January, Samuel forwarded the memorandum to Prime Minister H. H. Asquith and Foreign Minister Edward Grey for approval.

Lloyd George, who was later to be Prime Minister himself at the time of the Balfour Declaration, was noted by Asquith to be the only Cabinet member strongly in favour of the proposal.

== The memorandum ==
The memorandum began by noting that the outbreak of what was later called World War I presented an opportunity for a change "in the status of Palestine". He said that it would be too early for an independent Jewish state, and that incorporation into the British Empire would be the solution "which would be much the most welcome to the leaders and supporters of the Zionist movement throughout the world".

The memorandum then set out five benefits to the British Empire of such a strategy. These were:

1. It would enable the country "to fulfil in yet another sphere her historic part of civiliser of the backward countries."
2. It would raise the prestige of the British Empire
3. It would allow a positive outcome of the war for the British Empire without stripping Germany of her colonies and creating a war of revenge
4. It would improve the defences of Egypt, acting as a strong frontier
5. It "would win for England the lasting gratitude of the Jews throughout the world", including 2 million Jews in the United States

The alternatives to British annexation were then considered. French annexation was considered "unwelcome to the Jews", Internationalisation would "lay the country under a dead hand", annexation to a Greater Egypt would introduce complications, and leaving the country to the Ottomans with guarantees for Jewish colonisation would be likely to leave the situation substantially unimproved.

Samuel then concluded by noting that whilst a British Palestine would not alone solve the Jewish question in Europe, it would have an important effect upon "the character" of the world's Jews, thereby enriching the world. Samuel concluded by referencing a famous parliamentary speech given by Thomas Babington Macaulay in 1833 during the emancipation of British Jews

"Let a Jewish centre be established in Palestine; let it achieve, as I believe it would achieve, a spiritual and intellectual greatness; and insensibly, but inevitably, the character of the individual Jew, wherever he might be, would be ennobled. The sordid associations which have attached to the Jewish name would be sloughed off, and the value of the Jews as an element in the civilisation of the European peoples would be enhanced. The Jewish brain is a physiological product not to be despised. For fifteen centuries the race produced in Palestine a constant succession of great men – statesmen and prophets, judges and soldiers. If a body be again given in which its soul can lodge, it may again enrich the world. Till full scope is granted, as Macaulay said in the House of Commons, "let us not presume to say that there is no genius among the countrymen of Isaiah, no heroism among the descendants of the Maccabees."

== Reactions ==
According to Friedman, the final March version ("as presumably also the January one") was not discussed in either Cabinet or the War Council.

Prime Minister H. H. Asquith noted on January 28 about the first draft:

"I have just received from Herbert Samuel a memorandum headed 'The Future of Palestine'... He thinks we might plant in this not very promising territory about three or four million European Jews, and that this would have a good effect on those left behind. It reads almost like a new edition of Tancred brought up to date...it is a curious illustration of Dizzy's [Disraeli's] favourite maxim that 'race is everything' to find this almost lyrical outburst proceeding from the well ordered and methodical brain of H.S."...

and in March about the final version:

"I think I have already referred to Herbert Samuel's dithyrambic memorandum, urging that in carving up the Turks' Asiatic dominions we should take Palestine, into which the scattered Jews would in time swarm back from all quarters of the globe, and in due course obtain Home Rule. Curiously enough, the only other partisan of this proposal is Lloyd George, who I need not say, does not care a damn for the Jews or their past or their future, but thinks it will be an outrage to let the Holy Places pass into the possession or the protection of 'agnostic, atheistic France'"

Writing earlier on 5 February, Rufus Isaacs, 1st Marquess of Reading noted that "[Lloyd-George was] inclined to the sympathetic side – your proposal appeals to the poetic and imaginative as well as to the romantic and religious qualities of his mind". Samuel's cousin and Anti-Zionist Edwin Montagu wrote a letter to Asquith on 16 March 1915:

"Palestine in itself offers little or no attraction to Great Britain from a strategical or material point of view"..."[Palestine would be] incomparably a poorer possession than, let us say, Meopotamia"..."I cannot see any Jews I know tending olive trees or herding sheep"..."There is no Jewish race now as a homogenous whole. It is quite obvious that the Jews in Great Britain are as remote from the Jews in Morocco or the black Jews in Cochin as the Christian Englishman is from the moor or the Hindoo"..."If only our peoples would...take their place as non-conformists, then Zionism would obviously die and Jews might find their way to esteem."

== External references ==
- Schneer, Jonathan (2011). The Balfour Declaration: The Origins of the Arab-Israeli Conflict. A&C Black. pp. 145–. ISBN 978-1-4088-0970-9.
- Elath, Eliahu (1976). Zionism at the UN: A Diary of the First Days. Jewish Publication Society of America. pp. 81–. ISBN 978-0-8276-0083-6.
- Huneidi, Sahar (2001). A Broken Trust: Sir Herbert Samuel, Zionism and the Palestinians. I.B.Tauris. p. 84. ISBN 978-1-86064-172-5.
- Fromkin, David (1990). A Peace to End All Peace: The Fall of the Ottoman Empire and the Creation of the Modern Middle East. Avon Books. ISBN 978-0-380-71300-4.
- Friedman, Isaiah (1973). The Question of Palestine: British-Jewish-Arab Relations, 1914–1918. Transaction Publishers. ISBN 978-1-4128-3868-9.
- Rose, Norman (2010). A Senseless, Squalid War: Voices from Palestine, 1890s to 1948. Pimlico. pp. 15–. ISBN 978-1-84595-079-8.
- Lorenzo Kamel (2015). Imperial Perceptions of Palestine: British Influence and Power in Late Ottoman Times. British Academic Press. ISBN 978-1-78453-129-4.
