= Stuart Russell (politician) =

British politician and soldier (1909–1943)

Captain Stuart Hugh Minto Russell MP

Member of Parliament for Darwen
- In office 1935–1943
- Preceded by: Herbert Samuel
- Succeeded by: Capt. Stanley Prescott

Personal details
- Born: 18 January 1909 Surrey, England
- Died: 30 October 1943 (aged 34) El Alamein, Egypt
- Resting place: Alexandria (Hadra) War Memorial Cemetery (ref. 6. G. 21)
- Party: Conservative
- Parents: Sir Charles Lennox Somerville Russell (father); Lady Russell (née Elliot) (mother)
- Education: Rugby School; Trinity College, Cambridge
- Military career
- Allegiance: United Kingdom
- Branch: British Army
- Rank: Captain
- Service number: 94775
- Unit: Coldstream Guards
- Conflicts: Second World War; North African Campaign; Second Battle of El Alamein †

Captain Stuart Hugh Minto Russell (18 January 1909 – 30 October 1943) was a Conservative Party politician in the United Kingdom.

== Early life ==
Stuart Hugh Minto Russell was born on 18 January 1909 to Sir Charles Lennox Somerville Russell and Lady Russell (née Elliot) from Crooksbury Hurst in Surrey. For his education he attended Rugby School and Trinity College, Cambridge.

== Member of Parliament ==
=== 1935 general election ===
Russell stood as Conservative candidate in the Parliamentary constituency of Darwen in Lancashire at the 1935 General Election. He stood to become a Member of Parliament (MP) against Liberal Party leader (and sitting MP) Herbert Samuel and a Labour candidate. The local party chairman, Colonel Felix Knowles, telegraphed Stanley Baldwin to query the Liberal Party statements that Baldwin would like to see Herbert Samuel returned as MP. In response, Baldwin telegraphed -

Wire received. Statement untrue. Heartily support Stuart Russell and hope Darwen will return him and uphold the National Government.

— Stanley Baldwin

He was described by The Times as 'a young man with a personality' and so impressed the Conservative candidate selection committee in Darwen that they started a fund for his campaign. It was the first time that the constituency party had ever established a fund for a candidate.

=== Parliamentary service ===
==== Maiden speech ====
After entering the House of Commons, Russell's maiden speech on 22 April 1936 in a debate of the question, "That it is expedient to amend the law relating to the National Debt, Customs and Inland Revenue (including Excise) and to make further provision in connection with finance".

He rose at 16.59 began his first remarks to the house -

I should like to ask the Committee to extend to me that indulgence which is always shown by hon. and right hon. Members to a Member who rises to address the House for the first time. Yesterday I listened with very great interest to the speech of the Chancellor of the Exchequer, and I am certain that hon. Members share with him the very great disappointment which has been occasioned on account of the sums required for the rearmament programme of this country, which have so rudely and so swiftly shattered the hope which the Chancellor entertained of giving a substantial remission of the heavy burden which has for so long been imposed upon the taxpayers of this country. The alteration of the equilibrium has been practically entirely due to the money which has to be found for the defence programme. That programme, some of us feel, was postponed too long. The sums required for it should have been more evenly distributed over recent years. Be that as it may, the money has now to be found.

— Stuart Russell MP

==== Italian invasion of Abyssinia ====
Following the Italian invasion of Abyssinia, the Labour Party put forward a vote of censure due to the government's handling of the crisis. The vote took place on 23 June 1936 with the motion of censure defeated by 384 to 170. The Times noted that Russell felt that, "the Government were blessed for having kept an unprepared nation out of a European war fought on behalf of the League".

==== Working hours ====
He spoke in general support of a reduction of working hours with the proviso that, "...this can be done without determent to the prosperity of the industry concerned". He also supported, "...the action of His Majesty's Government in resisting proposals which would endanger the earnings of British workers".

==== Parliamentary Private Secretary ====
Russell was Parliamentary Private Secretary to the Under Secretary of State for Air, Sir Phillip Sassoon between 1936 and 1937. He also served as Parliamentary Private Secretary to the Chancellor of the Exchequer between 1937 and 1938. He resigned from this position so he could speak freely in support of the Prime Minister's foreign policy.

== Second World War ==
=== Norway Debate ===
Russell attended the Norway Debate, voting against the government. In the Commons Dining Room, the Chancellor of the Exchequer Sir John Simon approached Russell and Somerset de Chair at their table. Sir John asked, "May I ask which way you young people are going to vote?" To this, de Chair replied, "Against you".

=== Military service and death ===
In 1943, Russell died on active service at El Alamein, Egypt, as a captain of the Coldstream Guards in World War II, aged 34. He rests in the care of the Commonwealth War Graves Commission at Alexandria (Hadra) War Memorial Cemetery. His brother, Lieutenant Raymond Lennox Somerville, also died while on active service on 17 July 1941 at the age of 28.

After his death, the by-election for his seat was won by the Conservative candidate Captain Stanley Prescott.

Parliament of the United Kingdom
Preceded by Herbert Samuel	Member of Parliament for Darwen; 1935–1943	Succeeded by Stanley Prescott
