= Donald Johnson (British politician) =

British general practitioner and politician

Member of Parliament for Carlisle
- In office 26 May 1955 – 25 September 1964
- Preceded by: Alfred Hargreaves
- Succeeded by: Ronald Lewis

Personal details
- Born: Donald McIntosh Johnson; 17 February 1903
- Died: 5 November 1978 (aged 75)
- Party: Conservative (1945–1978)
- Other political affiliations: Liberal (1935–1945)
- Education: Gonville and Caius College, Cambridge

Donald McIntosh Johnson (17 February 1903 – 5 November 1978) was a British general practitioner, author and politician who was a member of parliament for nine years. He regarded himself as a 'Cassandra' (one whose prophecies were true but never believed), and he was described by one observer as "an eccentric man of considerable personal charm and egotistical obstinacy" who had failed to prove it was possible to be both a Conservative and Independent MP at the same time.

== Family and education ==
Johnson was from a Lancashire family and was sent to Cheltenham College (an Independent school), where he did well, and Gonville and Caius College, Cambridge, where he read medicine and obtained a first class honours degree. Interested in entering the profession of medicine, he went on to St Bartholomew's Hospital on an Entrance Scholarship.

Donald Johnson was married twice and fathered three children, two boys and a girl (Carol). One of his sons was Christopher Louis McIntosh Johnson. His second wife, Betty, whom he met at the Marlborough Arms (see below), died in 1979.

== Early career ==
In 1926 Johnson qualified as a doctor. His first medical job was as Medical Officer on the Cambridge University East Greenland Expedition of 1926; when he returned, he took up the post of Casualty Officer at the Metropolitan Hospital in London. In 1927 he was House Physician at the East London Hospital for Children. In 1928, his love of travel having again taken him away from Britain, he was Medical Officer to the Harrington Harbour Hospital in Quebec, which was run by the International Grenfell Association, a charity.

Johnson returned to become a General Practitioner at Thornton Heath in Croydon, south London, from 1930. In that year he was also called to the Bar, although he never practised. He became interested in politics and active in the Liberal Party, and in the 1935 general election he was the Liberal Party's candidate in Bury.

== By-election candidate ==
In 1936 Johnson retired from full-time work to devote himself to politics. In May 1937 he was chosen as the Liberal candidate at the Bewdley by-election, caused after Prime Minister Stanley Baldwin retired and was given a Peerage. With the Labour Party not fielding a candidate, the Liberal camp felt optimistic. Johnson was beaten by 6,543 votes, in a constituency in which Baldwin had been unopposed at the two previous elections.

== Wartime activities ==
Johnson worked as a part-time Demonstrator of Anatomy at Oxford University from 1937. As war threatened in July 1939 he enlisted in the Royal Army Medical Corps (TA), being commissioned as a Captain and serving in Bristol. During the Blitz on London, Johnson's Belgian first wife Christiane Coussaert whom he had married in 1928 was killed by German bombs.

Johnson himself moved to Woodstock, Oxfordshire where he bought the Marlborough Arms Hotel. He remained interested in politics and at the Liberal Assembly in 1941 he protested against the "generally stagnant state" of the party, as well as the effects of the political truce. This position was held by a group of other Liberals and after the speech Johnson found himself made Chairman of the Liberal Action Group (later known as "Radical Action") which they formed. He was a member of the Liberal Central Council.

== Chippenham by-election ==
In 1943, when the constituency of Chippenham was vacated by the death of Victor Cazalet in an aircraft crash, he decided to fight the resulting by-election as an unofficial Liberal candidate. As with other wartime by-elections, a large part of the electorate was engaged in war service and in Chippenham most of the rest were involved in agriculture. Johnson fought a vigorous campaign, asserting that victory was close and asking whether victorious troops would "return to a Tory-controlled world of unearned privilege on the one hand and frustrated ambitions and 2,000,000 unemployed on the other?" Due to the electoral truce, the Conservative candidate was officially supported by the leader of the Liberal Party, Sir Archibald Sinclair, and by the Communist Party of Great Britain, which Johnson attacked as "unwarrantable interference". The result gave the Conservative candidate David Eccles a majority of only 195; Johnson believed the Sinclair letter had been decisive in losing him the seat.

In the aftermath of Chippenham, Johnson had serious thoughts about fighting the next by-election, in Peterborough. However, a local unofficial Labour candidate was found and Johnson abandoned his campaign. In the 1945 general election Johnson fought Chippenham again. Although selected as an official Liberal candidate, he presented himself to the electors as an "Independent Liberal". He came bottom of the poll, beaten by Eccles and Labour candidate Andrew Tomlinson; Johnson had tried to persuade the Labour Party to stand down in his favour again, but without success.

== Political shift ==
After his defeat in 1945, Johnson resigned from the Liberal Party, due to "disappointment at the hopelessness of the Liberals". He received invitations to join the Labour Party from Frank Pakenham and to join the Conservatives from David Eccles, who had beaten him in Chippenham. "After months of agonising reappraisal" he decided to join the Conservatives, recruited by their slogan "set the people free".

In 1946 Johnson wrote a book called The End of Socialism, subtitled "The reflections of a radical". It was described as "an essay in anti-collectivist philosophy". He had revised his views since 1943 and had joined the Society of Individualists, which was later to become Society for Individual Freedom. In 1947 he signed a statement of principles in a pamphlet called "Design for Freedom" published by individual members of the Conservative and Liberal Parties with a view to merger. The idea of a merger of the parties was strongly resisted by the Liberal leadership. Johnson was approved on the list of Conservative Parliamentary candidates, but found difficulty in getting approval from selection committees which he felt was down to his Liberal background.

Johnson became a publisher in the late 1940s, setting up his own company specialising in travel and cricket books. Among his authors were S. P. B. Mais, and Johnson himself wrote an epilogue for Jonathan Swift's "A Voyage to Laputa" asking whether Swift had predicted the end of socialism. He married his second wife, Betty Plaisted, in 1947. Among his own full works were "A Doctor Regrets" (1948), "Bars and Barricades" (1952) and "Indian Hemp, a Social Menace" (1952).

During this period, Johnson was appointed as a member of the Croydon Medical Board by the Ministry of Labour and National Service in 1951. He was an active member of Sutton and Cheam Conservative Association, and in 1951 he was elected a member of Sutton and Cheam borough council.

== Carlisle MP ==
In February 1954, Johnson was chosen as prospective Conservative Party candidate for Carlisle, a constituency held by Labour. He achieved a swing of 4% and won the seat by 370 votes; Carlisle was one of only three seats which the Conservatives won with a swing of over the average.

He began his Parliamentary career by campaigning for the continued prescription of heroin to addicts who presented for treatment, in the light of the ban that was then in prospect. His maiden speech was not until February 1956, in which he called for a standstill in wage increases and dividends in the short term, and wage increases tied to production increases in the long term. He soon made his mark as a rebellious MP, who voted against the Government's Coal Industry Bill which allowed increased borrowing by the National Coal Board. He openly criticised the Government for not making any mention of health in the 1956 Queen's Speech.

One long campaign by Johnson was to improve psychiatric services on the National Health Service. He also took up the cause of mental hospitals, to which he believed too many old people were being wrongly committed. He pressed for restrictions on the pharmaceutical industry, arguing that old-fashioned remedies such as Sodium bicarbonate and Epsom salts often worked just as well.

== Ombudsman campaign ==
After re-election with an increased majority of 1,998 in the 1959 general election, Johnson became the first person in either House of Parliament to raise the possible appointment of an Ombudsman in a written question answered on 5 November 1959. He strongly opposed a proposal to introduce merit awards and differential payments for doctors. He was derisive about a Government proposal to allow "healers who claim to cure disease by super-normal means" to practise in hospitals in 1960.

Johnson had kept up his output of books up, including A Doctor Returns (1956) and A Doctor in Parliament (1958). He had supported the Net Book Agreement by which resale prices of books were fixed and after Penguin books were acquitted of publishing an obscene book in Lady Chatterley's Lover, he asked for a system in which publishers could voluntarily submit books for clearance which would be an absolute defence. In April 1961 he broke the Conservative whip to support the return of corporal punishment.

== Licensing ==
One constituency concern was over licensing, because the government had nationalised all the public houses in Carlisle in 1916, retaining ownership ever since. Johnson urged that this experiment be ended. He served on the Standing Committee debating the Licensing Bill in 1961, and persuaded the Government to accept a clause requiring that drinking water be available in all licensed premises. He also succeeded in getting other operators allowed to open licensed premises in Carlisle, and the Government pledged to look at the future of the experiment.

Johnson took up his campaign for an Ombudsman again in May 1961, initiating a debate on 19 May, working together with Labour MP Hugh Delargy. This was the first debate on the proposition. In February 1962 he sought leave to introduce a Bill to make vaccination compulsory, but found the suggestion resisted and lost the vote by 186 to 77. He wrote "Welcome to Harmony" (1962) and the provocatively-titled "The British National Health Service: Friend or Frankenstein?" later that year.

== Position within the Conservative Party ==
Johnson was highly critical of the Government for its response to the spy scandals of the early 1960s, and abstained rather than endorse Harold Macmillan's response to the Profumo affair. 26 other Conservatives abstained, which reduced the Government's majority to 69; Johnson was much taken by his friend and fellow Conservative MP Henry Kerby's pointing out the sexual connotations of the number, later commenting "I am not sure what the late Professor Jung would have made of this one".

Outside the House of Commons, Johnson declared that he could not possibly fight his constituency if Macmillan remained as Prime Minister, and later called for Lord Home to take over the premiership.

This demonstration of disloyalty was badly received by the executive of Carlisle Conservative Association, who voted to begin to select a different candidate. Although Macmillan did resign and Home was appointed as his successor, Johnson declared that he was considering resigning his seat, because he had been "shot out as if I were an office boy"; however he admitted that friends in Parliament were urging him to stay. When the Association called a meeting to discuss his candidature for 30 December, Johnson declared that he wanted the press admitted. They were admitted, and at the end, the executive's vote of no confidence in Johnson was upheld by 138 to 31.

On 23 January 1964 Johnson gave up the Conservative Party whip in the House of Commons. He described himself as an Independent Conservative and in June sought leave to introduce a Bill to bring in the Single Transferable Vote system; leave was refused by 137 to 20. Johnson made the case for the Bill as a way of reducing local party discipline over MPs, and shortly after published a pamphlet called "The Political Hatchet Men" which argued that the disciplinary powers of the Whips had been transferred to local constituency chairmen.

== 1964 general election ==
Johnson decided to defend his seat in the 1964 general election as a "Conservative and Independent". He had a formidable campaign organisation but won only 2.9% of the vote, which experts described as "substantially below recent votes for rebel M.P.s".

In June 1966 Johnson settled a libel action against the publishers of the Cumberland Evening News over a letter published two days before polling day in the 1964 general election. The letter had been from Trevor Rabbidge, who was Johnson's agent in 1955, and was described by Johnson's counsel as "[presenting] a distorted picture of the plaintiff's political and personal history".

== Later writing ==
Johnson's memoirs, A Cassandra at Westminster, were published in 1967. They gave his side of the dispute with the association but were regarded as demonstrating an excessive sense of personal grievance, and by dwelling on trivial matters: for example, Johnson regarded it as significant that the Government's majority on the Profumo affair was 69. His final book, A Doctor Reflects, was published in 1975; it was in effect the fifth volume in his autobiography.

Parliament of the United Kingdom
Preceded by Alex Hargreaves	Member of Parliament for Carlisle; 1955–1964	Succeeded by Ronald Lewis
