= Sir Frank Sanderson, 3rd Baronet =

British businessman (1933 – 2023)

Sir Frank Linton Sanderson, 3rd Baronet OBE (21 November 1933 – 9 November 2023) was a British executive and the third Baronet Sanderson of Malling Deanery.

== Biography ==
Frank Linton Sanderson was born on 21 November 1933 to of Sir Bryan Sanderson, 2nd Baronet, and his Polish-born wife Annette Korab-Laskowska. His grandfather, Frank Bernard Sanderson, was awarded a baronetcy for his contributions during the First World War.

Raised in Scaynes Hill, Sussex, Sanderson grew up in a multilingual household, with French and Polish influences. He was educated at Stowe School. His education was followed by National Service in the Royal Navy, where he served in Greece and the Caribbean. He later attended the University of Salamanca.

Sanderson's career primarily revolved around marine insurance, working at Minet and briefly in the hospitality industry with his wife's family business. He served as Master of the Currier's Company from 1993 to 1994.

Sanderson's notable contribution was his role in establishing a First World War museum near the Thiepval Memorial in Thiepval, France. He spearheaded fundraising efforts and engaged in negotiations to overcome resistance and bureaucratic hurdles. The museum, which opened in 2004, provides detailed information on British and Commonwealth soldiers from both world wars.

In 2005, Sanderson was appointed to the Order of the British Empire.

Baronetage of the United Kingdom
Preceded by Bryan Sanderson	Baronet (of Malling Deanery); 1992–2023	Succeeded by David Sanderson
