= 1943 Chippenham by-election =

UK by-election

Victor Cazalet (L) receiving Polish government documents in London from Stanislaw Grabski, May 24, 1943, six weeks before Cazalet died

The 1943 Chippenham by-election was a parliamentary by-election held in England on 24 August 1943 for the British House of Commons constituency of Chippenham in Wiltshire.

== Vacancy ==
The seat had become vacant when the constituency's Conservative Member of Parliament (MP), Victor Cazalet, was killed in an aircraft crash on 4 July 1943, aged 46. He had held the seat since the 1924 general election.

== Election history ==
Chippenham had been won by the Conservative Party at every election since 1924 and had become a safe seat. The result at the last General election was as follows;

1935 general election : Chippenham
Party	Candidate	Votes	%	±%
Conservative	Victor Cazalet	15,370	53.28	−3.5
Liberal	Arthur Stanton	9,949	34.49	−1.5
Labour	William Robert Robins	3,527	12.23	+5.0
Majority		5,421	18.79	−2.0
Turnout		28,846	77.52	−6.2
Conservative hold		Swing	+0.5	

== Candidates ==
The local Conservatives selected 39-year-old David Eccles to defend the seat. He worked for the Ministry of Economic Warfare from 1939 to 1940. He was Economic Adviser to the British ambassadors at Lisbon and Madrid from 1940 to 1942. He had been working for the Ministry of Production since 1942. He had not stood for parliament before.

The Labour party had selected Swindon man, H.F. Chilcott as their prospective candidate back in 1937 for the General Election expected to take place in 1939–40. The Liberals had selected T. Elder Jones as their prospective candidate for the General Election expected to take place in 1939-40 and he was still nominally their candidate at the outbreak of war.

At the outbreak of war, the Conservative, Liberal and Labour parties had agreed an electoral truce which meant that when a by-election occurred, the party that was defending the seat would not be opposed by an official candidate from the other two parties. When the Labour and Liberal parties joined the Coalition government, it was agreed that any by-election candidate defending a government seat would receive a letter of endorsement jointly signed by all the party leaders. This was enough to deter either Chippenham Liberal or Labour parties from submitting their candidate.

Elsewhere in the country, elements within both the Liberal and Labour parties had grown to dislike the electoral pact. At the 1942 Liberal Assembly a motion calling on the Liberal leader Sir Archibald Sinclair, to stop signing the endorsement letter, attracted the support of a third of the meeting. The chairman of the Liberal Action Group, which opposed the electoral truce, was 30-year-old Dr Donald Johnson. He argued that "Democracy should be practised as well as fought for". Johnson decided to contest the Chippenham by-election as an Independent Liberal and resigned from the party in order to do so. Before doing so he attended the Liberal Assembly in July 1943 in an attempt to rally activists in the party to support him in Chippenham. He had no link with Chippenham, but did have a track record as a parliamentary candidate. In the 1935 general election he was the Liberal Party's candidate in Bury. In May 1937 he was chosen as the Liberal candidate at the 1937 Bewdley by-election and finished a decent second. Johnson worked as a part-time Demonstrator of Anatomy at Oxford University from 1937. As war threatened in July 1939 he enlisted in the Royal Army Medical Corps (TA), being commissioned as a captain and serving in Bristol. During the Blitz on London, Johnson's Belgian first wife Christiane Coussaert whom he had married in 1928 was killed by German bombs. Johnson moved to Woodstock, Oxfordshire where he bought the Marlborough Arms Hotel.

== Campaign ==
Polling day was set for 24 August 1943. When nominations closed, it was to reveal a two horse race, between the Conservative Eccles and the Independent Liberal Johnson.

Eccles received a joint letter of endorsement from all the leaders of the parties in the coalition, including Sinclair. The Communist Party of Great Britain also formally supported Eccles, an act which Johnson attacked as "unwarrantable interference". Eccles also had the extensive local Conservative organisation in Chippenham to rely on to run his campaign.

Johnson tried to enlist the support of Chippenham Liberals, but apart from a handful, most abstained from the campaign. He tried to hire a Campaign Office, but found that he could not obtain any premises for the duration of the campaign. He organised no indoor meetings and instead relied on communicating his message by a loudspeaker fitted to his car. He was given support through visits from William Brown the Independent victor at the 1942 Rugby by-election and George Reakes the Independent victor at the 1942 Wallasey by-election. However Richard Acland and his Common Wealth Party by-election machine stayed away. Johnson fought a vigorous campaign, asserting that victory was close and asking whether victorious troops would "return to a Tory-controlled world of unearned privilege on the one hand and frustrated ambitions and 2,000,000 unemployed on the other?"

== Result ==
The result was a surprisingly narrow victory for the Conservative candidate, David Eccles

Chippenham by-election, 1943 Electorate
Party	Candidate	Votes	%	±%
Conservative	David Eccles	8,310	50.6	−2.7
Independent Liberal	Donald Johnson	8,115	49.4	New
Majority		195	1.2	−17.6
Turnout		16,425	41.4	−36.1
Conservative hold		Swing		

== Aftermath ==
Eccles and Johnson faced each other again 2 years later. Johnson had since re-joined the Liberal party and was adopted as candidate by the Chippenham Liberal Association, however in his campaign he still preferred to describe himself as an Independent Liberal. However, due to the intervention of a Labour candidate, Eccles was able to hold the seat comfortably. The result at the following General Election;

General election 1945: Chippenham Electorate 53,462
Party	Candidate	Votes	%	±%
Conservative	David Eccles	15,889	42.60	−10.7
Labour	Andrew Tomlinson	11,866	31.81	+19.6
Liberal	Donald Johnson	9,547	25.59	−8.9
Majority		4,023	10.79	−8.0
Turnout		37,302	69.77	−7.7
Conservative hold		Swing		

== See also ==
- List of United Kingdom by-elections
- United Kingdom by-election records
- Chippenham (UK Parliament constituency)
- 1962 Chippenham by-election
- Chippenham
