= Sir John Rutherford, 1st Baronet =

British politician (1854–1932)

Rutherford in 1895.

Sir John Rutherford, 1st Baronet (16 September 1854 – 26 February 1932) was a Conservative Party politician in the United Kingdom. He was educated at the Lancaster Royal Grammar School and the University of Glasgow.

Rutherford was Member of Parliament (MP) for Darwen in Lancashire from 1895 to January 1910 and from December 1910 to 1922.

Rutherford held a commission in the Duke of Lancaster's Own Yeomanry, where he was appointed a major on 27 August 1898, and received the honorary rank of lieutenant-colonel on 25 October 1902.

He was made a baronet on 27 January 1916.

A thoroughbred racehorse owner, his best horse was Solario, a winner of the St Leger Stakes and Ascot Gold Cup.

Parliament of the United Kingdom
Preceded by Charles Philip Huntington	Member of Parliament for Darwen; 1895–January 1910	Succeeded by Frederick George Hindle
Preceded by Frederick George Hindle	Member of Parliament for Darwen; December 1910–1922	Succeeded by Sir Frank Sanderson
Baronetage of the United Kingdom
New creation	Baronet (of Beardwood); 1916–1932	Extinct
