= Frank Sanderson =

British politician (1880–1965)

Sir Frank Bernard Sanderson, 1st Baronet (4 October 1880 – 18 July 1965) was a British public servant and Conservative & Unionist politician.

== Background ==
Born at Hull in Yorkshire, the youngest son of John Sanderson (1837–1906) and Anne née Barrett (1844–1915), his family were prosperous merchants. Established as ship agents then importers of yeast, lead and glass, his uncle Alfred Sanderson (1831–1881) founded "A. Sanderson & Co." which his father then took over diversifying into paint and varnish manufacturing at the Kingston Colour Works. Harry Herbert Sanderson (1880–1962), a cousin, practiced as a solicitor establishing the eponymous Hull law firm.

== Life ==
Sanderson, a successful Yorkshire businessman, was recruited by David Lloyd George to serve in the Ministry of Munitions during World War I as Controller of Trench Warfare National Shell Filling Factories and Stores (1915–19) and of Aircraft Ammunition Filling and Chemical Ammunition Filling (1916–19).

In the 1920 Birthday Honours he was created a baronet, taking the territorial designation of Malling Deanery in South Malling in the County of Sussex, in recognition of his invaluable unpaid contributions to the Allied war effort.

Sanderson entered politics in 1922 being elected as Member of Parliament (MP) for Darwen, but was defeated at the 1923 general election by the Liberal, Sir Frederick Hindle. He was returned to parliament for Darwen defeating Hindle at the 1924 general election, but lost the seat again at the 1929 general election to future Liberal Party leader, Herbert Samuel.

Choosing not to recontest Darwen, at the 1931 general election Sanderson was returned to parliament as MP for Ealing, a seat he held until its abolition prior to the 1945 general election, then being elected to represent the newly-created Ealing East constituency. A member of the Public Accounts Committee from 1942 until retiring from the House of Commons at the 1950 general election, he was an advocate of compulsory voting.

Then elected a permanent member of the Inter-Parliamentary Union, Sir Frank was also a member of Lloyd's and served as Chairman of the Humber Fishing Company 1924–65.

== Family ==
Sanderson married firstly in 1904 Edith Amy Wing (1882–1949), 2nd daughter and co-heiress of David Wing, of Scarborough, Yorkshire, having three children:

- Lieutenant-Commander Sir Bryan Sanderson, 2nd Baronet, RNVR (1910–1992), married Annette Korab-Laskowska (1907–1967), only daughter of Colonel Vincent Korab-Laskowski and granddaughter of General Count Nicolas de Castella, having two sons and a daughter:
  - Sir Frank Sanderson, 3rd Baronet, OBE
  - Peter Sanderson, born 1943, who married Elizabeth Grün, having one daughter
  - Merry Sanderson, born 1936, married Captain David Archibald Evelyn Lyle, 16th/5th Royal Lancers (1930–2017), having three sons
- Derek Maxwell Sanderson (1914–1983), married Daphne Elton (1917–2008), having three sons and a daughter
- Pearl Sanderson (1906–2003), married firstly Gerald Donner, a grandson of CID Assistant Chief Constable Sir Melville Macnaghten, and secondly Major Alan Sherman James RA.

A widower, in 1951 he married secondly Joan Cubberley (1920–1995). Sir Frank died in 1965, being buried at St Bartholomew's Church, Burwash, and was succeeded in the baronetcy by his elder son, Sir Bryan Sanderson, 2nd Baronet.

== Honours ==
- - Baronet (1920)
- - Polonia Restituta (1921)

Coat of arms of Sir Frank Sanderson, Bt, MP

Crest
Between two Wings Or a Sinister Arm embowed in chain mail armour grasping a Scimitar Proper pommelled and hilted Or
Escutcheon
Azure a Maunch between three Annulets Or
Motto
Sans Dieu Rien (French)

== See also ==
- Sanderson baronets

Parliament of the United Kingdom
Preceded by Sir John Rutherford	Member of Parliament for Darwen; 1922–1923	Succeeded by Sir Frederick Hindle
Preceded by Sir Frederick Hindle	Member of Parliament for Darwen; 1924–1929	Succeeded by Herbert Samuel
Preceded by Sir Herbert Nield	Member of Parliament for Ealing; 1931–1945	Constituency abolished
New constituency	Member of Parliament for Ealing East; 1945–1950	Constituency abolished
Baronetage of the United Kingdom
New creation	Baronet (of Malling Deanery); 1920–1965	Succeeded by Sir Bryan Sanderson
