= 1937 Bewdley by-election =

UK Parliamentary by-election

The 1937 Bewdley by-election was held on 29 June 1937. The by-election was held due to the elevation to the peerage of the incumbent Conservative MP, Stanley Baldwin. It was won by the Conservative candidate Roger Conant.

Bewdley by-election, 1937 Electorate
Party	Candidate	Votes	%	±%
Conservative	Roger Conant	15,054	63.9	N/A
Liberal	Donald Johnson	8,511	36.1	New
Majority		6,543	27.8	N/A
Turnout		23,565	60.6	N/A
Conservative hold		Swing	N/A	
