= Stanley Prescott =

British politician (1912-1962)

William Robert Stanley Prescott

Member of Parliament for Darwen
- In office 1943–1951
- Preceded by: Stuart Russell
- Succeeded by: Sir Charles Fletcher-Cooke

Personal details
- Born: 25 April 1912
- Died: 6 June 1962 (aged 50)
- Party: Conservative
- Parents: Sir William Prescott (father); Bessie Stanley (mother)
- Relatives: Mark Prescott (son)
- Education: St John's College, Cambridge

(William Robert) Stanley Prescott (25 April 1912 – 6 June 1962) was a Conservative Party politician in the United Kingdom.

He was educated at St John's College, Cambridge.

He was elected as member of parliament (MP) for the Darwen constituency at a by-election in December 1943 following the death of the Conservative MP Stuart Russell. He held the seat until he retired from the House of Commons at the 1951 general election.

He was the younger son of Sir William Prescott, who was MP for Tottenham North from 1918 to 1922. His son, Mark Prescott, inherited the baronetcy in 1965.

== Notes ==
Parliament of the United Kingdom
Preceded by Stuart Russell	Member of Parliament for Darwen; 1943–1951	Succeeded by Sir Charles Fletcher-Cooke
