= Sanderson baronets =

Set index for Sanderson baronets

There have been three baronetcies created for persons with the surname Sanderson, two in the Baronetage of Great Britain and one in the Baronetage of the United Kingdom. As of 2026 one creation is extant.

- Sanderson baronets of Greenwich (1720)
- Sanderson baronets of the City of London (1794): see Sir James Sanderson, 1st Baronet (1741–1798)
- Sanderson baronets of Malling Deanery (1920)
