= Herbert Samuel, 1st Viscount Samuel =

British politician (1870–1963)

The Right Honourable The Viscount Samuel GCB OM GBE PC
- Samuel c. 1916

Leader of the Liberal Party
- In office 4 November 1931 – 26 November 1935
- Deputy: Archibald Sinclair
- Preceded by: David Lloyd George
- Succeeded by: Archibald Sinclair

Deputy Leader of the Liberal Party
- In office 13 June 1929 – 4 November 1931
- Leader: David Lloyd George
- Preceded by: John Simon
- Succeeded by: Archibald Sinclair

1st High Commissioner for Palestine
- In office 1 July 1920 – 30 June 1925
- Preceded by: Position created
- Succeeded by: Sir Herbert Plumer
Ministerial positions
Home Secretary
In office 26 August 1931 – 1 October 1932
Prime Minister	Ramsay MacDonald
Preceded by	John Robert Clynes
Succeeded by	Sir John Gilmour, Bt
In office 12 January – 7 December 1916
Prime Minister	H. H. Asquith
Preceded by	Sir John Simon
Succeeded by	Sir George Cave
Postmaster-General
In office 26 May 1915 – 18 January 1916
Prime Minister	H. H. Asquith
Preceded by	Sir Charles Hobhouse
Succeeded by	Joseph A. Pease
In office 14 February 1910 – 11 February 1914
Prime Minister	H. H. Asquith
Preceded by	Sydney Buxton
Succeeded by	Sir Charles Hobhouse
Chancellor of the Duchy of Lancaster
In office 25 November 1915 – 11 February 1916
Prime Minister	H. H. Asquith
Preceded by	Winston Churchill
Succeeded by	Edwin Montagu
In office 25 June 1909 – 14 February 1910
Prime Minister	H. H. Asquith
Preceded by	The Lord Fitzmaurice
Succeeded by	Joseph A. Pease
President of the Local Government Board
In office 11 February 1914 – 25 November 1915
Prime Minister	H. H. Asquith
Preceded by	John Burns
Succeeded by	Walter Long
Under-Secretary of State for the Home Department
In office 12 December 1905 – 25 June 1909
Prime Minister	Henry Campbell-Bannerman; H. H. Asquith
Preceded by	Thomas Cochrane
Succeeded by	Charles Masterman

Member of Parliament for Darwen
- In office 30 May 1929 – 25 October 1935
- Preceded by: Frank Sanderson
- Succeeded by: Stuart Russell

Member of Parliament for Cleveland
- In office 5 November 1902 – 25 November 1918
- Preceded by: Alfred Pease
- Succeeded by: Park Goff

Personal details
- Born: Herbert Louis Samuel; 6 November 1870 Toxteth, Liverpool, England
- Died: 5 February 1963 (aged 92) London, England
- Party: Liberal
- Spouse: Beatrice Franklin
- Children: Edwin; Philip; Godfrey; Nancy
- Education: Balliol College, Oxford
- Herbert Samuel's voice Samuel speaking on campaign issues Recorded 1929

Herbert Louis Samuel, 1st Viscount Samuel (6 November 1870 – 5 February 1963) was a British politician who served as the leader of the Liberal Party from 1931 to 1935. The first Jew to serve as a Cabinet minister, Samuel promoted Zionism within the British Cabinet, beginning with his 1915 memorandum entitled The Future of Palestine. In 1920 he was appointed as the first High Commissioner for Palestine, in charge of the administration of the territory.

Samuel was the last member of the Liberal Party proper to hold one of the four Great Offices of State (as Home Secretary from 1931 to 1932 in the National Government of Ramsay MacDonald). One of the adherents of "New Liberalism", Samuel was on the progressive wing of the Liberal Party. He helped to draft and present social reform legislation while he was serving as a Liberal cabinet member. Samuel led the party in both the 1931 general election and the 1935 general election, during which period the party's number of seats in parliament fell from 59 to 21.

== Early life ==
Samuel in 1893

Herbert Samuel was born at Claremont No. 11 Belvidere Road, Toxteth, Liverpool, Lancashire, in 1870. The building now houses part of the Belvedere Academy. Around 1775, his great-grandfather, Menachem Samuel, had emigrated from Kempen in Posen (now Kępno), not far from the city of Posen (now Poznań), to Britain and his grandfather, Louis Samuel (1794–1859), was born in London. He was the son of Clara (Yates) and Edwin Louis Samuel (1825–1877). His uncle was born Montagu Samuel, but became better known as Samuel Montagu, founder of the eponymous bank. He was also known by a Hebrew name, Eliezer ben Pinchas Shmuel. His eldest brother, Sir Stuart Samuel, was also a successful Liberal politician; his only sister, Mabel (1862–1938) married the influential art-critic Marion Spielmann, from the Spielmann dynasty of bankers and art-connoisseurs.

He was educated at University College School in Hampstead, London and Balliol College, Oxford, but at home he had a Jewish upbringing. However, in 1892, while at Oxford he renounced all religious belief, writing to his mother to inform her. Samuel worked through the influence of Charles Darwin and the book On Compromise by senior Liberal politician John Morley. He remained a member of the Jewish community, however, to please his wife, and observed the Sabbath and Jewish food laws at home "for hygienic reasons". Samuel graduated from Oxford with a first in modern history in 1893.

== Early political career ==
Samuel unsuccessfully fought two general elections before being elected a Member of Parliament at the November 1902 Cleveland by-election, as a member of the Liberal Party. He was appointed to the Cabinet in 1909 by Prime Minister H. H. Asquith, first as Chancellor of the Duchy of Lancaster and then as Postmaster General, President of the Local Government Board and eventually Home Secretary.

He put forward the idea of establishing a British protectorate over Palestine in 1915, and his ideas influenced the Balfour Declaration. As Home Secretary, Samuel faced a shortage of manpower needed to fight in World War I, and he initiated legislation to offer thousands of Russian refugees (many of them young Jews) a choice between conscription into the British Army or returning to Russia for military service.

In December 1916, Asquith was replaced as prime minister by Lloyd George. Lloyd George asked Samuel to continue as Home Secretary, but Samuel chose to resign instead. He attempted to strike a balance between giving support to the new government while remaining loyal to Asquith. At the end of the war he sought election at the general election of 1918 as a Liberal in support of the Coalition government. However, the government's endorsement was given to his Unionist opponent, and he was defeated.

=== Women's rights ===
Initially he had not been a supporter of women's suffrage but then changed his position. In 1917, a Speaker's Conference was charged with looking into giving women the vote but did not have, in its terms of reference, consideration to women standing as candidates for Parliament. Samuel moved a separate motion on 23 October 1918 to allow women to be eligible as Members of Parliament. The vote was passed by 274 to 25, and the government rushed through a bill to make it law in time for the 1918 election.

== High Commissioner for Palestine ==
=== Background ===
One month after Britain's declaration of war on the Ottoman Empire in November 1914, Samuel met Chaim Weizmann, who was to become the President of the World Zionist Organization and later the first President of Israel. According to Weizmann's memoirs, Samuel was already an avid believer in Zionism and believed that Weizmann's demands were too modest. Samuel did not want to enter into a detailed discussion of his plans but mentioned that "the Jews would have to build railways, harbours, a university, a network of schools, etc", as well as potentially a Temple in "modernised form".

In January 1915, Samuel circulated a memorandum, The Future of Palestine, to his cabinet colleagues, suggesting that Britain should conquer Palestine in order to protect the Suez Canal against foreign powers, and for Palestine to become a home for the Jewish people. The memorandum stated, "I am assured that the solution of the problem of Palestine which would be much the most welcome to the leaders and supporters of the Zionist movement throughout the world would be the annexation of the country to the British Empire". In March 1915, Samuel replaced the January 1915 draft version with the final version of his memorandum, toned down from the earlier draft, explicitly ruling out any idea of immediately establishing a Jewish state and emphasizing that non-Jews must receive equal treatment under any scheme.

=== Appointment as High Commissioner ===
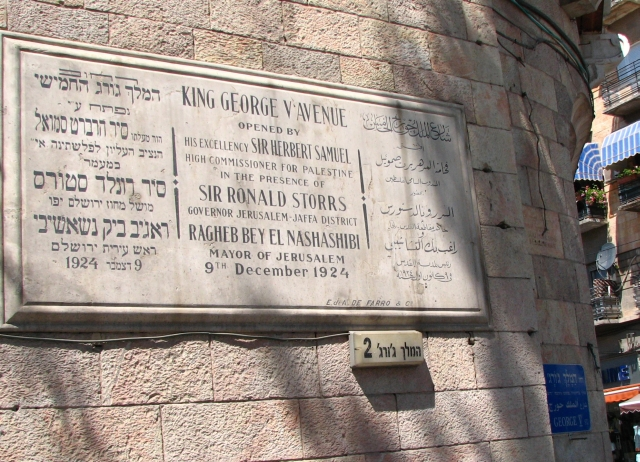
Historic plaque in King George Street, Jerusalem, marking the opening of the street in 1924 by Herbert Samuel, during his term as High Commissioner

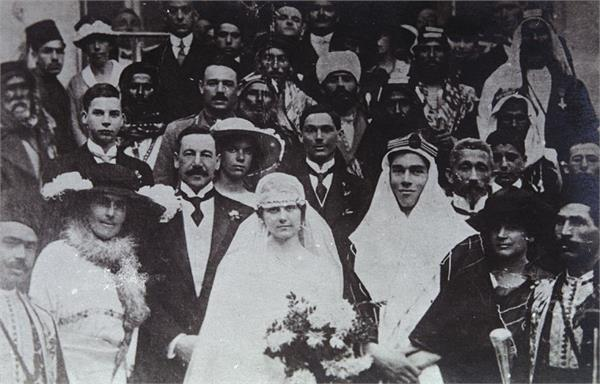
Herbert Samuel at wedding of his son Edwin Samuel, 1920

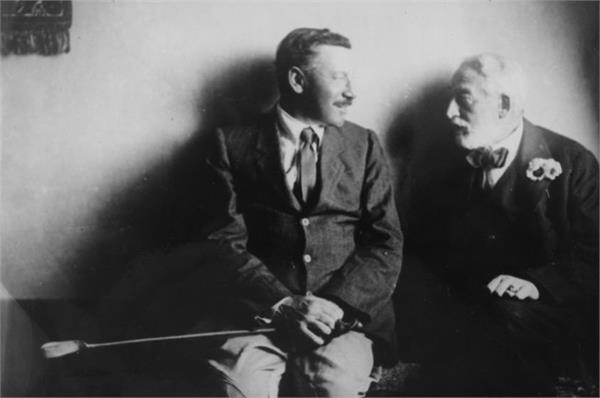
Herbert Samuel with Edmond Rothschild, 1920

In 1917, Britain occupied Palestine (then part of the Ottoman Empire) during the course of the First World War. Samuel lost his seat in the election of 1918 and became a candidate to represent British interests in the territory.

He was appointed to the position of High Commissioner in 1920, before the Council of the League of Nations approved a British mandate for Palestine. Nonetheless, the military government withdrew to Cairo in preparation for the expected British Mandate, which was finally granted two years later by the League of Nations. He served as High Commissioner until 1925. Samuel was the first Jew to govern the historic Land of Israel in 2000 years.

He recognised Hebrew as one of the three official languages of the territory. He was appointed Knight Grand Cross of the Order of the British Empire (GBE) on 11 June 1920.

Samuel's appointment to High Commissioner for Palestine was controversial. While the Zionists welcomed the appointment of a Zionist Jew to the post, the military government, headed by Edmund Allenby and Louis Bols, called Samuel's appointment "highly dangerous".

Technically, Allenby noted, the appointment was illegal, as a civil administration that would compel the inhabitants of an occupied country to express their allegiance to it before a formal peace treaty (with the Ottoman Empire) was signed violated both military law and the Hague Convention. Bols said the news was received with "consternation, despondency and exasperation" by Muslims and Christians. Allenby said that the Arabs would see it "as handing country over at once to a permanent Zionist Administration" and predicted massive violence.

Lord Curzon read the last message to Samuel and asked him to reconsider accepting the post. Samuel took advice from a delegation in London representing the Zionists, who told him that the "alarmist" reports were not justified. The Muslim-Christian Association had sent a telegram to Bols:

Sir Herbert Samuel regarded as a Zionist leader, and his appointment as first step in formation of Zionist national home in the midst of Arab people contrary to their wishes. Inhabitants cannot recognise him, and Muslim-Christian Society cannot accept responsibility for riots or other disturbances of peace.

The wisdom of appointing Samuel was debated in the House of Lords a day before he arrived in Palestine. Lord Curzon said that no "disparaging" remarks had been made during the debate but that "very grave doubts have been expressed as to the wisdom of sending a Jewish Administrator to the country at this moment".

Questions in the House of Commons of the period also show much concern about the choice of Samuel: "what action has been taken to placate the Arab population... and thereby put an end to racial tension". Three months after his arrival, The Morning Post commented: "Sir Herbert Samuel's appointment as High Commissioner was regarded by everyone, except Jews, as a serious mistake."

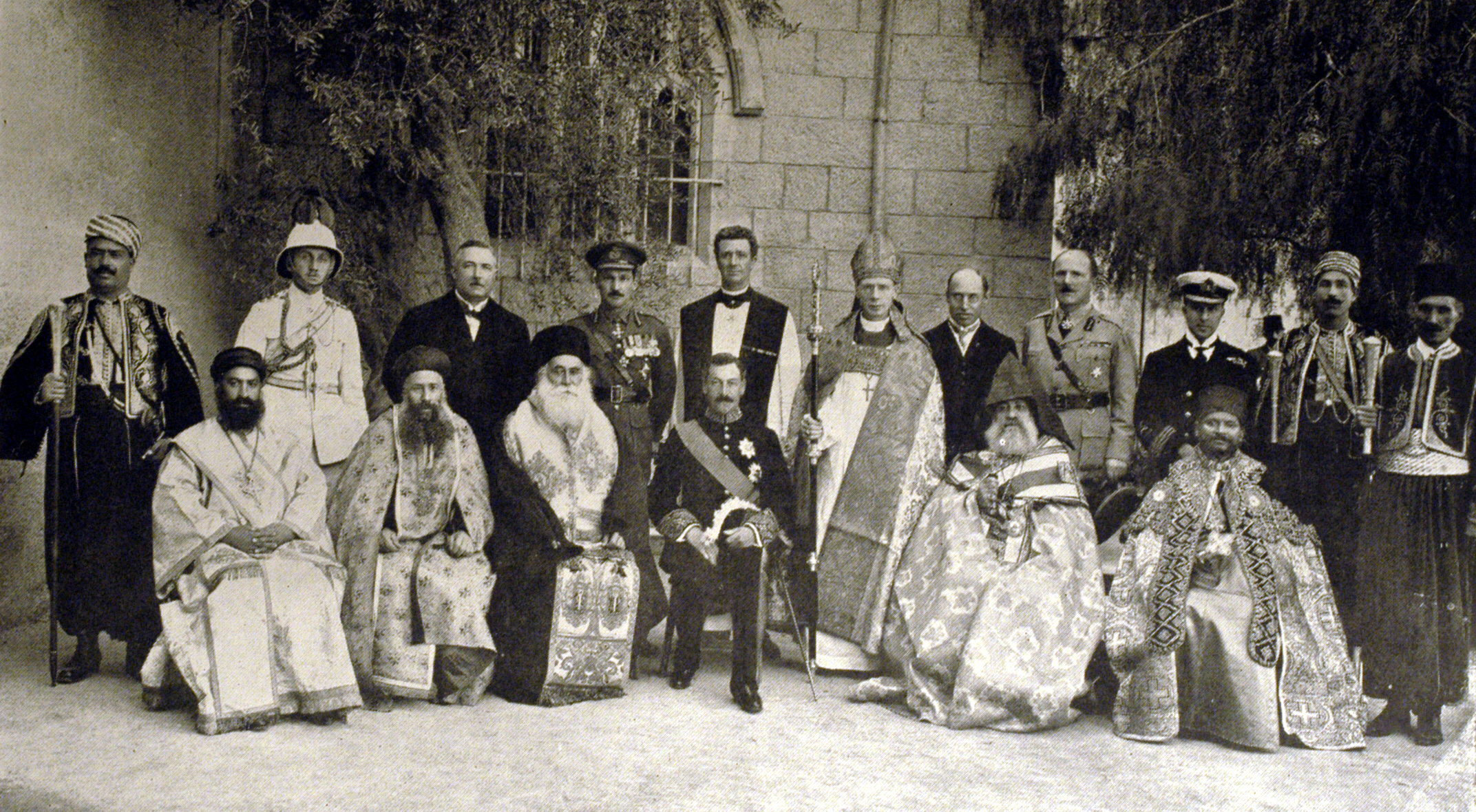
Sir Herbert Samuel, seated centre, with Jerusalem church leaders and British officials, 1922.

=== Tenure ===
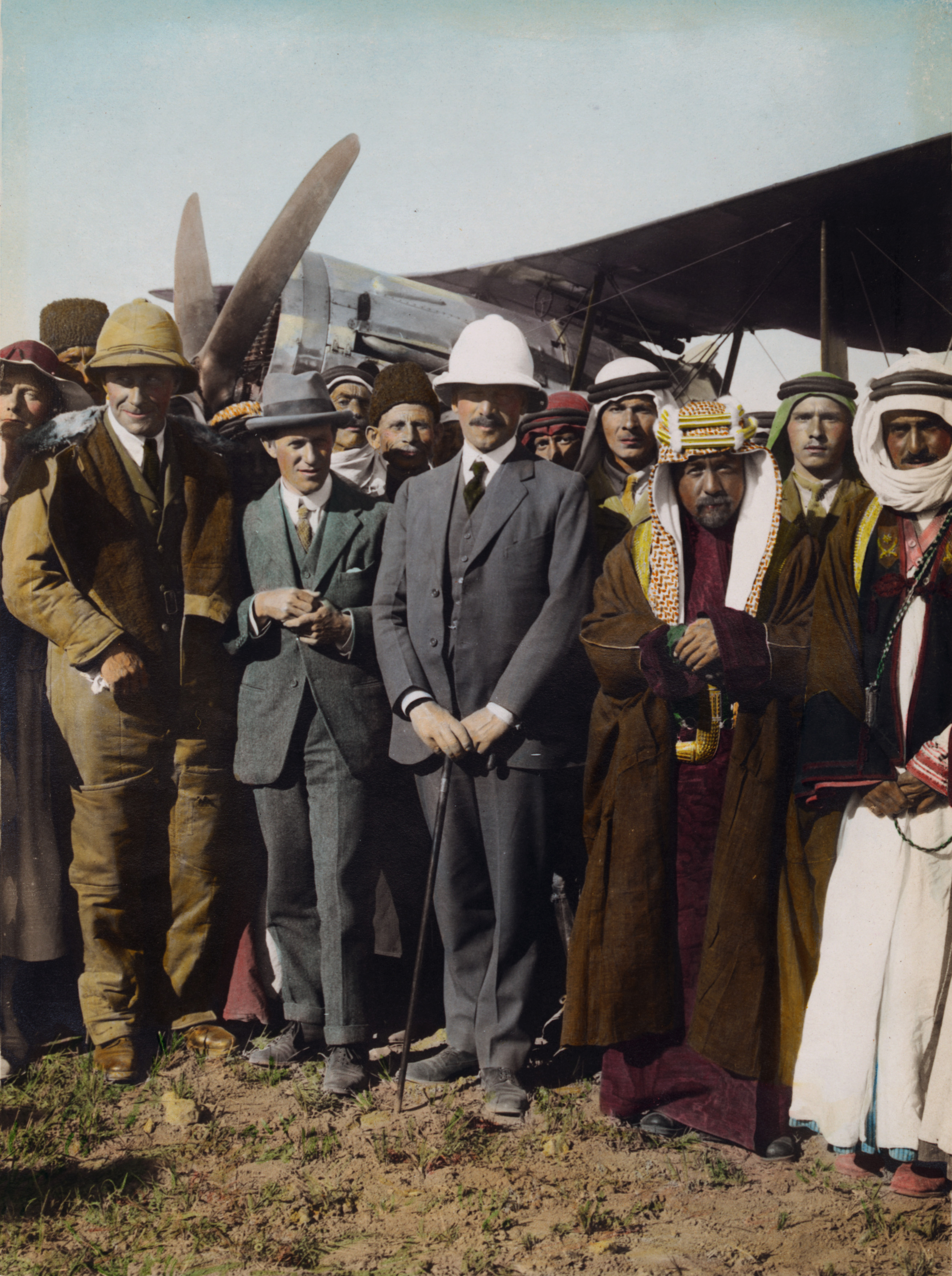
Sir Herbert Samuel (centre), with T. E. Lawrence (in homburg hat), Sheik Majid Pasha el Adwan (at far right) and Gertrude Bell (at left) at the aerodrome of Amman, April 1921

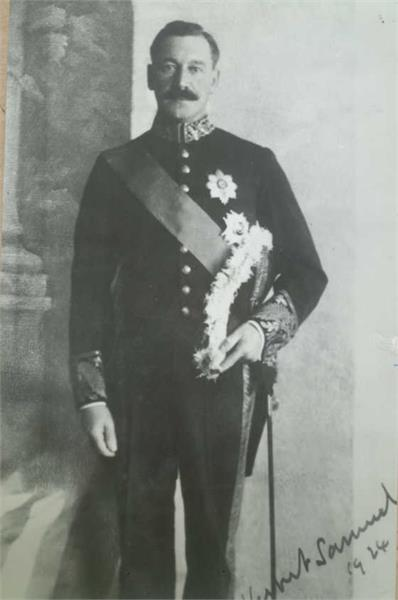
Herbert Samuel, 1924

As High Commissioner, Samuel attempted to mediate between Zionist and Arab interests, acting to slow Jewish immigration and win the confidence of the Arab population. He hoped to gain Arab participation in mandate affairs and to guard their civil and economic rights, but refused them any authority that could be used to stop Jewish immigration and land purchase. According to Wasserstein his policy was "subtly designed to reconcile Arabs to the... pro-Zionist policy" of the British.

Islamic custom at the time was that the chief Islamic spiritual leader, the Grand Mufti of Jerusalem, was to be chosen by the temporal ruler, the Ottoman Sultan in Constantinople, from a group of clerics nominated by the indigenous clerics. After the British conquered Palestine, Samuel chose Haj Amin al Husseini, who later proved a thorn in the side of the British administration in Palestine. Samuel received respect from the Jewish community, and he was called to the Torah at the Hurva synagogue in the Old City of Jerusalem.

During Samuel's administration the Churchill White Paper was published. It supported Jewish immigration within the economic absorptive capacity of the country to accommodate them and defined the Jewish national homeland as:

not the imposition of a Jewish nationality upon the inhabitants of Palestine as a whole, but the further development of the existing Jewish community, with the assistance of Jews in other parts of the world, in order that it may become a centre in which the Jewish people as a whole may take, on grounds of religion and race, an interest and a pride.

Samuel won the confidence of all sections of the population by his noted "impartiality". He struck a particularly strong relationship with Pinhas Rutenberg, granting him exclusive concessions to produce and distribute electricity in Palestine and Trans-Jordan, often strongly backing Rutenberg in his relations with the Colonial Office in London. Samuel government signed the Ghor-Mudawarra Land Agreement with the Baysan Valley Bedouin tribes, that earmarked for transfer 179,545 dunams of state land to the Bedouin.

Samuel's role in Palestine is still debated. According to Wasserstein:

He is remembered kindly neither by the majority of Zionist historians, who tend to regard him as one of the originators of the process whereby the Balfour Declaration in favour of Zionism was gradually diluted and ultimately betrayed by Great Britain, nor by Arab nationalists who regard him as a personification of the alliance between Zionism and British imperialism and as one of those responsible for the displacement of the Palestinian Arabs from their homeland. In fact, both are mistaken.

== Later political career ==
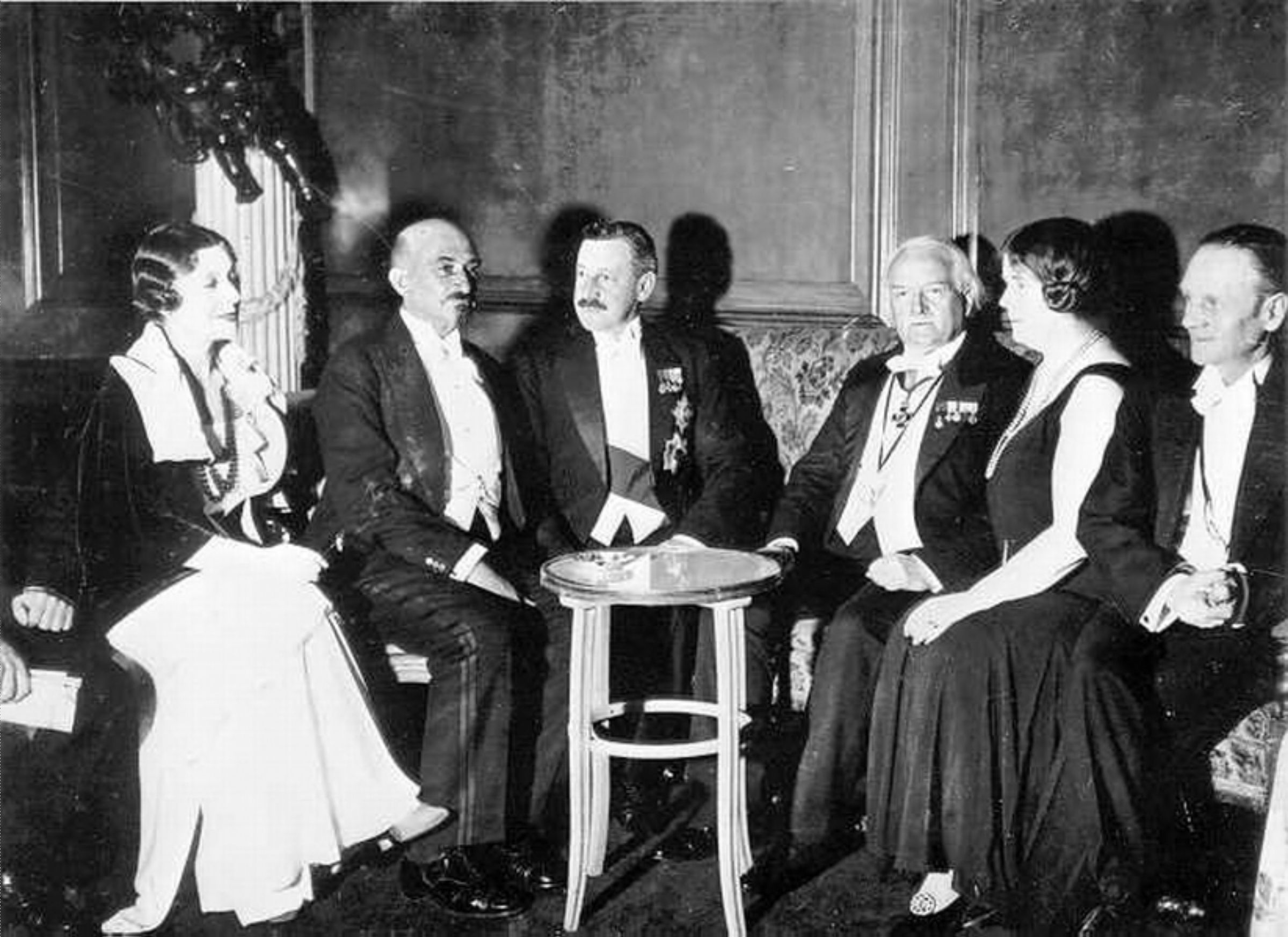
Vera Weizmann, Chaim Weizmann, Herbert Samuel, Lloyd George, Ethel Snowden and Philip Snowden

Samuel returned to the House of Commons following the 1929 general election. Two years later, he became deputy leader of the Liberal Party and acted as leader in the summer of 1931 when Lloyd George was ill. Under Samuel, the party served in the first National Government of Prime Minister Ramsay MacDonald formed in August 1931, with Samuel himself serving as Home Secretary. However the government's willingness to consider the introduction of protectionist tariffs and call a general election to seek a mandate led to the Liberal Party fragmenting into three distinct groups. Sir John Simon had already led a breakaway group of MPs to form the Liberal National Party.

The Liberal leader, Lloyd George, led a small group of Independent Liberals, opposing the National Government. That left Samuel effectively as leader of the parliamentary party and in control of party headquarters. The government's moves to introduce tariffs caused further friction for the Liberals, and Samuel withdrew the party from the government in stages, first obtaining the suspension of cabinet collective responsibility on the matter to allow Liberal members of the government to oppose tariffs. In October 1932, the Liberal ministers resigned their ministerial posts but continued to support the National Government in parliament. Finally, in November 1933, Samuel and the bulk of the Liberal MPs crossed the floor of the House of Commons and opposed the government outright. He remained leader of the Liberal Party until he again lost his seat in 1935.

In 1937, he was granted the title Viscount Samuel; later that year, Samuel, despite his Jewish ancestry, aligned himself with Prime Minister Neville Chamberlain's appeasement policy towards Adolf Hitler, urged that Germany be cleared of its 1914 war guilt and recommended the return of German colonies lost after the war. His biographer John Edward Bowle noted Samuel's recollection of his comments to Lord Halifax in a conversation shortly before the Anschluss in 1938:

I said that I regarded Hitler as a man with a conscience — a conscience that sometimes led him to do things that were very bad; but he was not a man who would do what he knew to be a crime as Napoleon would have. The danger was that, being a mystic and impetuous, he might easily be swept away at some moment of crisis.

He declined a later offer by Chamberlain to return to government. In 1938, he supported the Kindertransport movement for refugee children from Europe with an appeal for homes for them.

Samuel later became the leader of the Liberal Party in the House of Lords (1944–1955). During the 1951 general election, on 15 October 1951, Samuel became the first British politician to deliver a party political broadcast on television. He had previously fronted a broadcast on television at the 1950 election, but this was merely a recording of a radio speech he had made earlier the same evening rather than a true party political broadcast.

== Family ==
On 17 November 1897 Samuel married his first cousin Beatrice Miriam (1871–1959), daughter of Ellis Abraham Franklin, a banker. They had three sons and one daughter. His son, Edwin, served in the Jewish Legion.

Samuel was great-uncle to the scientist Rosalind Franklin, the co-discoverer of DNA.

== Literary career ==
In his later years, he remained concerned over the future of humanity and of science, writing three books: Essays in Physics (1951), In Search of Reality (1957) and a collaborative work, A Threefold Cord: Philosophy, Science, Religion (1961). The three works tended to conflict with the beliefs of the scientific establishment, especially as his collaborator and friend in the last work was Herbert Dingle.

== Arms ==
Coat of arms of Herbert Samuel, 1st Viscount Samuel
Crest In front of a Sun rising Or a Dove wings elevated and addorsed holding in the beak an Olive Branch proper Escutcheon Or a Bend between two Caps of Liberty Gules on a Chief Sable a Balance of the first Supporters On either side a Lion Or the dexter gorged with a Collar Gules and resting the interior hind leg on a Stump of Oak eradicated and sprouting proper the sinister gorged with an Eastern Crown also Gules and resting the interior hind leg on a Stump of Olive eradicated and sprouting also proper Motto Turn Not Aside

== See also ==
- Liberalism in the United Kingdom
- Pro-Jerusalem Society - Herbert Samuel was its Honorary President

== Bibliography ==
- Samuel, Viscount Herbert (1937). Belief and Action: An Everyday Philosophy. London.
- Samuel, Viscount Herbert (1945). Memoirs. London.
- Samuel, Horace Barnett (1930). Unholy Memories of the Holy Land. L. and Virginia Woolf.
- John Edward Bowle (1957). Viscount Samuel: A Biography. Victor Gollancz.
- Trevor Wilson (ed.), The Political Diaries of C.P.Scott 1911–1928, Collins: St James Place, London, 1970.
- Wasserstein, Bernard (October 1976). "Herbert Samuel and the Palestinian Problem". English Historical Review. 91 (361).
- Wasserstein, Bernard (1992). Herbert Samuel: A Political Life. Clarendon Press.
- Segev, Tom (2000). One Palestine, complete: Jews and Arabs under the British mandate. London: Little, Brown. ISBN 0-316-64859-0.
- Huneidi, Sahar (2001). A Broken Trust, Herbert Samuel, Zionism and the Palestinians. London.

Parliament of the United Kingdom
Preceded by Alfred Pease	Member of Parliament for Cleveland; 1902–1918	Succeeded by Sir Park Goff, Bt
Preceded by Sir Frank Sanderson, Bt	Member of Parliament for Darwen; 1929–1935	Succeeded by Stuart Russell
Political offices
Preceded by Thomas Cochrane	Under-Secretary of State for the Home Department; 1905–1909	Succeeded by Charles Masterman
Preceded by The Lord FitzMaurice	Chancellor of the Duchy of Lancaster; 1909–1910	Succeeded by Jack Pease
Preceded by Sydney Buxton	Postmaster General; 1910–1914	Succeeded by Charles Hobhouse
Preceded by John Burns	President of the Local Government Board; 1914–1915	Succeeded by Walter Long
Preceded by Charles Hobhouse	Postmaster General; 1915–1916	Succeeded by Jack Pease
Preceded by Winston Churchill	Chancellor of the Duchy of Lancaster; 1915–1916	Succeeded by Edwin Samuel Montagu
Preceded by Sir John Simon	Home Secretary; January–December 1916	Succeeded by Sir George Cave
Preceded by J. R. Clynes	Home Secretary; 1931–1932	Succeeded by Sir John Gilmour, Bt
Diplomatic posts
Preceded by Sir Louis Bols; As Chief Administrator of Palestine	High Commissioner of Palestine; 1920–1925	Succeeded by The Lord Plumer
Party political offices
Preceded by John Simon	Deputy Leader of the Liberal Party; 1929–1931	Succeeded by Sir Archibald Sinclair, Bt
Preceded by David Lloyd George	Leader of the Liberal Party; 1931–1935	Succeeded by Sir Archibald Sinclair, Bt
Preceded by The Marquess of Crewe	Leader of the Liberals in the House of Lords; 1944–1955	Succeeded by The Lord Rea
Peerage of the United Kingdom
New creation	Viscount Samuel; 1937–1963	Succeeded by Edwin Samuel
