= Ealing East =

Parliamentary constituency in the United Kingdom, 1945–1950

- Former borough constituency for the House of Commons

1945–1950
- Seats: one
- Created from: Ealing
- Replaced by: Ealing South

Ealing East was one of two and a minority of a third constituency covering the Municipal Borough of Ealing in Middlesex, 1945–1950. It included the town centre and in terms of local government content became, after its abolition, part of west London in 1965 at which time the borough expanded further to the east and west.

Its voters returned one member (MP) to the House of Commons of the UK Parliament using the first past the post system.

Its single election was the general election of 1945, a landslide for Clement Attlee leading the Labour Party, at which the seat de facto re-elected (i.e. as incumbent) Frank Sanderson, a Conservative who had represented the seat's main forebear, Ealing.

== History ==
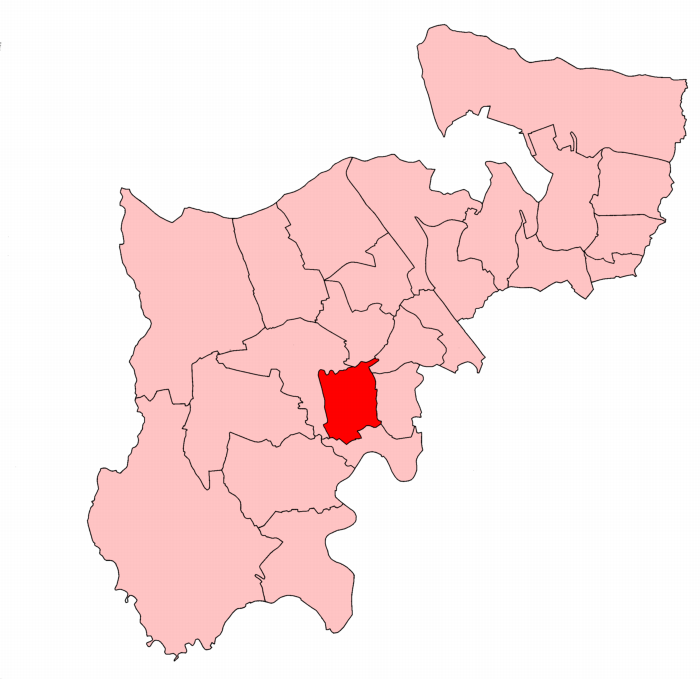
Ealing East in Middlesex, 1945–50

The constituency was created for the 1945 general election, and abolished for the 1950 general election. The Municipal Borough of Ealing was then represented by the new Ealing North and Ealing South constituencies save for Hanwell which remained throughout in the Southall seat to the west, created in 1945.

== Boundaries ==
The six Municipal Borough of Ealing wards: Castlebar, Drayton, Grange Grosvenor, Lammas, Manor, and Mount Park.

== Members of Parliament ==
Election	Member	Party	Notes
1945	Frank Sanderson	Conservative	Member for Ealing (1931–1945)
1950	constituency abolished in name only, see Ealing South		

== Election result ==
General election 1945: Ealing East
Party	Candidate	Votes	%
Conservative	Frank Sanderson	22,916	47.8
Labour	David Johnston	18,619	38.9
Liberal	Harold Foster	6,377	13.3
Majority		4,297	9.0
Turnout		47,912	73.2
Registered electors		65,485	
Conservative win (new seat)			

for results of 1950–1970 elections see Ealing South
