= Darwen (constituency) =

Parliamentary constituency in the United Kingdom, 1885–1983

- Former county constituency for the House of Commons
- Darwen in Lancashire, showing boundaries used from 1974–1983

1885–1983
- Seats: one
- Created from: North East Lancashire
- Replaced by: Rossendale & Darwen, Blackburn, Bolton North East and Ribble Valley

Darwen was a county constituency in Lancashire, centred on the town of Darwen. It returned one Member of Parliament to the House of Commons of the Parliament of the United Kingdom from 1885 until it was abolished for the 1983 general election.

During the 1920s, the constituency was a fiercely contested marginal between the Liberal and Conservative Parties, with the sitting MP defeated at each election. At the 1924 general election, it saw a 92.7% turnout, a record for an English constituency. Following the defeat of Liberal leader Sir Herbert Samuel in 1935, the seat became a safe Conservative seat for the remainder of its existence.

It was largely replaced by the new Rossendale & Darwen constituency.

== Boundaries ==
1885–1918: The Boroughs of Over Darwen and Blackburn, the Sessional Divisions of Darwen and Walton-le-Dale, and parts of the Sessional Divisions of Blackburn and Clitheroe.

1918–1950: The Borough of Darwen, the Urban District of Turton, and the Rural District of Blackburn.

1950–1955: The Borough of Darwen, the Urban Districts of Turton and Withnell, and the Rural District of Blackburn. Withnell Urban District was added from the pre-1950 Chorley constituency.

1955–1983: The St. Andrew's, St. Francis's and St. Mark's wards of the County Borough of Blackburn, the Borough of Darwen, the Urban District of Turton, and the Rural District of Blackburn.

== Members of Parliament ==
Election	Member	Party
1885	James Gascoyne-Cecil	Conservative
1892	Charles Philip Huntington	Liberal
1895	Ald. John Rutherford	Conservative
Jan 1910	Frederick George Hindle	Liberal
Dec 1910	Ald. John Rutherford	Conservative
1922	Sir Frank Bernard Sanderson	Conservative
1923	Frederick Hindle	Liberal
1924	Sir Frank Bernard Sanderson	Conservative
1929	Sir Herbert Samuel	Liberal
1935	Stuart Russell	Conservative
1943 by-election	Stanley Prescott	Conservative
1951	Sir Charles Fletcher-Cooke	Conservative
1983	constituency abolished	

== Election results ==
=== Elections in the 1880s ===
General election 1885: Darwen
Party	Candidate	Votes	%	±%
Conservative	James Gascoyne-Cecil	5,878	50.0	
Liberal	John Gerald Potter	5,873	50.0	
Majority		5	0.0	
Turnout		11,751	93.0	
Registered electors		12,629		
Conservative win (new seat)				

General election 1886: Darwen
Party	Candidate	Votes	%	±%
Conservative	James Gascoyne-Cecil	6,085	53.2	+3.2
Liberal	John Slagg	5,359	46.8	−3.2
Majority		726	6.4	+6.4
Turnout		11,444	90.6	−2.4
Registered electors		12,629		
Conservative hold		Swing	+3.2	

=== Elections in the 1890s ===
General election 1892: Darwen
Party	Candidate	Votes	%	±%
Liberal	Charles Huntington	6,637	50.8	+4.0
Conservative	James Gascoyne-Cecil	6,423	49.2	−4.0
Majority		214	1.6	N/A
Turnout		13,060	94.3	+3.7
Registered electors		13,844		
Liberal gain from Conservative		Swing	+4.0	

John Rutherford

General election 1895: Darwen
Party	Candidate	Votes	%	±%
Conservative	John Rutherford	7,058	53.2	+4.0
Liberal	Charles Huntington	6,217	46.8	−4.0
Majority		841	6.4	N/A
Turnout		13,275	93.4	−0.9
Registered electors		14,220		
Conservative gain from Liberal		Swing	+4.0	

=== Elections in the 1900s ===
General election 1900: Darwen
Party	Candidate	Votes	%	±%
Conservative	John Rutherford	7,228	51.7	−1.5
Liberal	Charles Huntington	6,758	48.3	+1.5
Majority		470	3.4	−3.0
Turnout		13,986	91.4	−2.0
Registered electors		15,308		
Conservative hold		Swing	−1.5	

General election 1906: Darwen
Party	Candidate	Votes	%	±%
Conservative	John Rutherford	7,792	50.1	−1.6
Liberal	Frederick Hindle	7,767	49.9	+1.6
Majority		25	0.2	−3.2
Turnout		15,559	94.0	+2.6
Registered electors		16,544		
Conservative hold		Swing	-1.6	

=== Elections in the 1910s ===
General election January 1910: Darwen
Party	Candidate	Votes	%	±%
Liberal	Frederick Hindle	8,639	50.6	+0.7
Conservative	John Rutherford	8,428	49.4	−0.7
Majority		211	1.2	N/A
Turnout		17,067	96.2	+2.2
Registered electors		17,734		
Liberal gain from Conservative		Swing	+0.7	

General election December 1910:Darwen
Party	Candidate	Votes	%	±%
Conservative	John Rutherford	8,384	50.6	+1.2
Liberal	Frederick Hindle	8,169	49.4	−1.2
Majority		215	1.2	N/A
Turnout		16,553	93.3	−2.9
Registered electors		17,734		
Conservative gain from Liberal		Swing	+1.2	

General Election 1914–15:

Another General Election was required to take place before the end of 1915. The political parties had been making preparations for an election to take place and by July 1914, the following candidates had been selected;

- Unionist: John Rutherford
- Liberal: Frederick Hindle

General election 1918: Darwen
Party		Candidate	Votes	%	±%
C	Unionist	John Rutherford	9,014	40.5	−10.1
	Liberal	Frederick Hindle	8,031	36.1	−13.3
	Labour	John McGurk	5,211	23.4	New
Majority			983	4.4	+3.2
Turnout			22,256	71.3	−22.0
Registered electors			31,203		
	Unionist hold		Swing	+1.6	
C indicates candidate endorsed by the coalition government.

=== Elections in the 1920s ===
General election 1922: Darwen
Party	Candidate	Votes	%	±%
Unionist	Frank Sanderson	12,218	42.6	+2.1
Liberal	Frederick Hindle	11,944	41.6	+5.5
Labour	John McGurk	4,528	15.8	−7.6
Majority		274	1.0	−3.4
Turnout		28,690	91.4	+20.1
Registered electors		31,379		
Unionist hold		Swing	−1.7	

General election 1923: Darwen
Party	Candidate	Votes	%	±%
Liberal	Frederick Hindle	14,242	48.8	+7.2
Unionist	Frank Sanderson	11,432	39.1	−3.5
Labour	George Thompson	3,527	12.1	−3.7
Majority		2,810	9.7	N/A
Turnout		29,201	90.6	−0.8
Registered electors		32,220		
Liberal gain from Unionist		Swing	+5.4	

General election 1924: Darwen
Party	Candidate	Votes	%	±%
Unionist	Frank Sanderson	13,017	43.0	+3.9
Liberal	Frederick Hindle	12,082	39.9	−8.9
Labour	Thomas Ramsden	5,188	17.1	+5.0
Majority		935	3.1	N/A
Turnout		30,287	92.7	+2.1
Registered electors		32,671		
Unionist gain from Liberal		Swing	+6.4	

Sir H. Samuel

General election 1929: Darwen
Party	Candidate	Votes	%	±%
Liberal	Herbert Samuel	15,714	40.9	+1.0
Unionist	Frank Sanderson	15,252	39.6	−3.4
Labour	Thomas Ramsden	7,504	19.5	+2.4
Majority		462	1.3	N/A
Turnout		38,470	92.3	−0.4
Registered electors		41,664		
Liberal gain from Unionist		Swing	+2.2	

=== Elections in the 1930s ===
General election 1931: Darwen
Party	Candidate	Votes	%	±%
Liberal	Herbert Samuel	18,923	48.85	
Conservative	Alan Graham	14,636	37.78	
Labour	Charles Rothwell	5,184	13.38	
Majority		4,287	11.07	
Turnout		38,743	92.18	
Liberal hold		Swing		

General election 1935: Darwen
Party	Candidate	Votes	%	±%
Conservative	Stuart Russell	15,292	41.11	
Liberal	Herbert Samuel	14,135	37.99	
Labour	Frances Kerby	7,778	20.90	
Majority		1,157	3.13	N/A
Turnout		37,212	89.91	
Conservative gain from Liberal		Swing		

=== Elections in the 1940s ===
A General election was due to take place before the end of 1940, but was postponed due to the Second World War. By 1939, the following candidates had been selected to contest this constituency;

- Conservative: Stuart Russell
- Liberal: Phillip Rea
- Labour: Ronald Haines

1943 Darwen by-election
Party	Candidate	Votes	%	±%
Conservative	Stanley Prescott	8,869	50.2	+9.1
Independent Liberal	Honor Balfour	8,799	49.8	New
Majority		70	0.4	−2.7
Turnout		17,668	45.0	−43.9
Conservative hold		Swing		

General election 1945: Darwen
Party	Candidate	Votes	%	±%
Conservative	Stanley Prescott	13,623	41.43	
Labour	Ronald Haines	11,282	34.31	
Liberal	Honor Balfour	7,979	24.26	
Majority		2,341	7.12	
Turnout		32,884	82.68	
Conservative hold		Swing		

=== Elections in the 1950s ===
General election 1950: Darwen
Party	Candidate	Votes	%	±%
Conservative	Stanley Prescott	17,903	48.5	+7.1
Labour	Ronald Haines	13,334	36.1	+1.8
Liberal	James Booth	5,656	15.3	−9.0
Majority		4,569	12.4	+5.3
Turnout		36,893	89.6	+6.9
Conservative hold		Swing		

General election 1951: Darwen
Party	Candidate	Votes	%	±%
Conservative	Charles Fletcher-Cooke	17,785	48.6	+0.1
Labour	Ronald Haines	14,605	39.9	+3.8
Liberal	Roy Francis Leslie	4,236	11.6	−3.7
Majority		3,180	8.7	−3.7
Turnout		36,626	88.6	−1.0
Conservative hold		Swing		

General election 1955: Darwen
Party	Candidate	Votes	%	±%
Conservative	Charles Fletcher-Cooke	26,729	58.7	+10.1
Labour	Ronald Haines	18,813	41.3	+1.4
Majority		7,916	17.4	+8.7
Turnout		45,542	82.3	−6.3
Conservative hold		Swing		

General election 1959: Darwen
Party	Candidate	Votes	%	±%
Conservative	Charles Fletcher-Cooke	27,483	59.0	+0.3
Labour	Trevor Park	19,141	41.0	−1.3
Majority		8,342	18.0	+0.6
Turnout		46,624	84.1	+1.8
Conservative hold		Swing		

=== Elections in the 1960s ===
General election 1964: Darwen
Party	Candidate	Votes	%	±%
Conservative	Charles Fletcher-Cooke	20,343	41.9	−17.1
Labour	Bob Cryer	15,559	32.0	−9.0
Liberal	Stephen C. Holt	12,641	26.0	New
Majority		4,784	9.9	−8.0
Turnout		48,543	83.7	−0.4
Conservative hold		Swing		

General election 1966: Darwen
Party	Candidate	Votes	%	±%
Conservative	Charles Fletcher-Cooke	20,598	42.2	+0.3
Labour	Brian Whittam	18,863	38.6	+6.6
Liberal	Stephen C. Holt	9,339	19.1	−6.9
Majority		1,735	3.6	−6.3
Turnout		48,800	82.6	−1.1
Conservative hold		Swing		

=== Elections in the 1970s ===
General election 1970: Darwen
Party	Candidate	Votes	%	±%
Conservative	Charles Fletcher-Cooke	26,728	52.4	+10.2
Labour	Brian Whittam	17,634	34.6	−4.0
Liberal	Alan Cooper	6,663	13.1	−6.0
Majority		9,094	17.8	+14.2
Turnout		51,025	76.6	−6.0
Conservative hold		Swing		

General election February 1974: Darwen
Party	Candidate	Votes	%	±%
Conservative	Charles Fletcher-Cooke	25,495	44.9	−7.5
Labour	Dale Campbell-Savours	16,185	28.5	−6.1
Liberal	Alan Cooper	15,060	26.5	+13.4
Majority		9,310	16.4	−1.4
Turnout		56,740	81.0	+4.4
Conservative hold		Swing		

General election October 1974: Darwen
Party	Candidate	Votes	%	±%
Conservative	Charles Fletcher-Cooke	23,577	43.6	−1.3
Labour	Dale Campbell-Savours	17,926	33.2	+4.7
Liberal	Alan Cooper	12,572	23.3	−3.2
Majority		5,651	10.4	−6.0
Turnout		54,075	76.6	−4.4
Conservative hold		Swing		

General election 1979: Darwen
Party	Candidate	Votes	%	±%
Conservative	Charles Fletcher-Cooke	30,789	52.6	+9.0
Labour	Louise Ellman	17,763	30.4	−2.8
Liberal	Alan Cooper	9,928	17.0	−6.3
Majority		13,026	22.3	+11.9
Turnout		58,480	78.0	+1.4
Conservative hold		Swing		

== See also ==
- 1943 Darwen by-election
