= John Robins (born c. 1511) =

English politician

John Robins (born c. 1511) was an English politician.

== Life ==
Little is known of Robins' personal life, and he is not thought to be originally from Dover. His date of death is unrecorded.

== Career ==
He was a mariner. In 1559 and 1563, Robins was Member of Parliament for Dover, Kent. In 1562–63 and 1575–76 he was Mayor of Dover.

Parliament of England
Preceded by Joseph Beverley with John Cheyne	Member of Parliament for Dover; 1562–1563; With: Thomas Warren	Succeeded by Thomas Warren with John Robins
Parliament of England
Preceded by Thomas Warren with John Robins	Member of Parliament for Dover; 1575–1576; With: Thomas Warren	Succeeded by Thomas Andrews II with John Pinchon
