= Edmund Rous =

16th-century English politician

Sir Edmund Rous (by 1521 – 1572 or later), of Dunwich, Suffolk, was an English landowner, magistrate, MP and Vice-Treasurer of Ireland.

== Origins ==
John Leland the antiquary, who lived in Sir Edmund's time, wrote:

"Al the Rousis that be in Southfolk cum, as I can lerne, oute of the house of Rouse of Dinnington. Diverse of the Rouses of this Eldest House ly in Dinington Paroche Chirche buried under flat Stones. Antony Rouse, now the Heire of Dinington Haule, hath much enlargid his Possessions."

Edmund was the second son of Sir William Rous of Dennington, Suffolk (presumed to have been MP for Dunwich in 1529), by Alice, daughter of the Judge Sir John Sulyard (died 1488) of Wetherden, Suffolk. He was a younger brother of Anthony Rous of Dennington (c. 1502-1546), Comptrouller of Calais 1542-44, who sat for Suffolk in 1545. The name Edmund was recurrent in the Rous family, and this Sir Edmund should not be confused with his mid-14th century ancestor the Captain of Guernsey, nor his mid-15th century ancestor Edmund Rous of East Lexham. Neither should his brother Anthony Rous (died 1546), of Dennington and Henham, be confused with Anthony Rous of Badingham (died 1555, the son of Reynold Rous), who appointed "the right worshipfull Sir Edmunde Rous, knight", one of his executors in his will.

== Life ==
=== Early career ===
Edmund's elder brother Anthony was married (to Agnes Blennerhasset of Frenze) by 1523, was Treasurer to the 3rd Duke of Norfolk by 1536, and succeeded their father as senior heir in 1538/39. The younger brother, George Rous, was a servant of Cromwell's in 1538, trusted with overseas business. In April 1536 Thomas Cromwell ordered the arrest of John Offley, said to be detaining £104 received from Edmund Rous's factor at Calais. In 1537 the Duke of Norfolk wrote to Cromwell complaining that Sir Arthur Hopton's men had taken four of his servant Edmund Rous's horses from the Duke's land at Sibton, while actions were under way for suppression of the Pilgrimage of Grace, but had not returned them. Hence it appears that Edmund was the Duke's servant.

Anthony, as he succeeded their father Sir William around 1539, gave up the Duke's service, thwarted Norfolk's attempts to appropriate the younger heiress of Sir Edward Echyngham, acquired some further manors and property in east Suffolk, and embarked on his short but lustrous career in connection with English possessions across the Channel. Edmund married Mary Paynell, a Lincolnshire heiress, by whom he had a daughter Margaret and possibly other children. When Anthony died in February 1545/46 he was succeeded by his son Thomas, so the senior Rous line did not descend to Edmund.

=== Landowner ===
He has been called "impecunious", an "unscrupulous and disreputable knight". He was a justice of the peace for Suffolk from 1543 to 1547. During the 1540s Rous owned and leased various estates in Suffolk, including former monastic property at Dunwich, and manors including Middleton with Fordley (1544), and Westleton. He purchased Wetherden Hall, in Hitcham, Suffolk, in 1542 from Sir John Clere, and leased it to Sir John Spring of Lavenham: Spring however died in 1547, and by 1551 the hall had been purchased from Rous by George Waldegrave, nephew of Sir John Spring's wife.

Edmund, then of Sibton, purchased lands and tenements in Westleton and Middleton from John Haughfen of Chillesford in 1547. He was the tenant of the site of the late monastery of Sibton, with the north grange and south grange, when Edward VI granted it, together with Rendham, to Sir Anthony Denny in 1547, and it was Sir Anthony who granted the manor of Rendham (Barnes) to him in that year. In 1550 he acquired the manor and messuage of Okynghill Hall at Badingham with its appurtenances, formerly of the Duke of Norfolk (attainted), as Thomas Hogan made grants to Edmund Rous, and to Anthony Rous of Badingham. In September 1552 Edmund Rous, of Dunwich, had licence to grant his manor of Rendham Barnes to Robert Hacon of Rendham.

In a land dispute of the later 1540s he legally challenged the existence of the Corporation of Dunwich. In 1550 he complained to the Chancellor of the Court of Augmentations that there were still two chantries functioning in Dunwich, one for the Maison Dieu (a hospital for the poor) and one for the parish church of St James, which led to the seizure of the documents and common seal of the house from the representatives of the Bailiffs.

=== Favour under Marian rule ===
Sir Edmund was knighted c. 1550. His service in Ireland appears to have begun in 1553, possibly in respect of his loyalty to Queen Mary in the succession crisis of that year: he became Vice-Treasurer of Ireland by December 1553. He was, nonetheless, in England for the elections of April 1554, when he was returned as Member of Parliament for Great Bedwyn. In October 1554 he was appointed (with the governors of Ireland) a commissioner to oversee the sale of Crown lands in Ireland, and named to receive the proceeds on behalf of the Crown. In November 1554 he obtained the seat at Dunwich, and in 1555 that of Dover where he was nominated by Sir Thomas Cheney.

He remained Vice-Treasurer of Ireland in March/April 1555, when he was granted the lordship of Athlone, with custody of the castle there (newly reconstructed by Sir William Brabazon), during pleasure, provided that he found room for the Council there whenever it might visit those parts; his term had ended by September 1555 when he obtained an Order of Council to conduct a naval expedition in the north of Ireland, ostensibly for the purposes of fishing, but really as a pretext for a private-enterprise expedition against Scots intruders from Kintyre, led by one Cole. This expedition took place in 1556. This is probably related to a licence issued in October 1555 to Sir Edmund and six others, their servants, factors and attorneys, to buy and convey 300 tuns of wine in vessels of any parts in amity with the kingdom.

He appears then to have maintained royal favour, for Robert Wingfield of Brantham (who calls him "a man ready in service") shows him in attendance upon Mary with Sir Nicholas Hare, Owen Hopton and John Tyrrell, and reports his appointment as submarshal when Henry Bedingfeld was Knight Marshal. This was during that interval in the long service of Ralph Hopton as Knight Marshal between 1556 and 1558, whose staunch Protestantism became irreconcileable with that position in the household. Despite his absences from Parliament Rous suffered little distraint on that account during Mary's reign, but his costs rose against him. In 1557 he was awarded 1,000 marks in respect of his rights in the manor of Okenhill at Badingham, payable by the Duke of Norfolk's executors, and this together with manors in Kent and debts owing to him in Ireland were granted by Edmund to Philip and Mary in respect of his debt to them of £3,420.

=== Last years ===
In 1559 he sat for the last time for Dunwich, and in the following years he was encumbered by debt, and pursued suits. It was found in 1561 that he had overvalued two of his Kentish manors when selling them to Queen Mary, and was obliged to sell lands and estates in Dunwich to Queen Elizabeth, to satisfy his recognizances. The lands were leased by the Crown to an alderman of Canterbury at a reduced rent, which Rous was required to make good, but in which it was found there had been a concealment. He faced several summons for debt in Hilary 1563, including one brought by John Payne of Bermondsey still identifying him as Vice-Treasurer of Ireland. The conduct of his service in Ireland, and the behaviour towards him of one of his servants there, William Goldwell, remained at issue. He brought suits against Thomas Ferror and Thomas Gyrlyng for the manors of Westleton and Hinton. He also engaged in litigation with John Copledicke over lands at Dunwich, Westleton, Middleton and Darsham. Having failed to appear in the Court of Common Pleas in to answer for a debt of £261 he was outlawed, but received a pardon (for the outlawry) in June 1569 upon surrendering himself to the Fleet Prison.

Parliament of England
Preceded by John Hungerford; Richard Fulmerston	Member of Parliament for Great Bedwyn; April–November 1554; With: Richard Fulmerston	Succeeded by Edward Hungerford; Richard Fulmerston
Preceded by Robert Browne; George Jerningham	Member of Parliament for Dunwich; November 1554 – 1555; With: Robert Coppyn	Succeeded by George Saxmundham; Andrew Green
Preceded by William Hannington; John Webbe	Member of Parliament for Dover; 1555–1558; With: Thomas Warren	Succeeded by Joseph Beverley; John Cheney
Preceded by Thomas Pycto; John Browne	Member of Parliament for Dunwich; 1558/9–1562/3; With: Gregory Coppyn	Succeeded by Robert Hare; Robert Coppyn
