= John Payntor =

16th-century English politician

John Payntor (by 1482–1540), of Dover, Kent, was an English politician.

== Life ==
Payntor married a woman named Joan; they had a son, Thomas, and a daughter, Joan.

== Career ==
Payntor was Mayor of Dover in 1536. He was a member of parliament for Dover in 1539.

Parliament of England
Preceded by Robert Nethersole with John Warren	Member of Parliament for Dover; 1539; With: Thomas Vaughan	Succeeded by John Warren with William Granger
