= Gyles =

Gyles is a masculine given name and a surname. Bearers of the name include:

== Surname ==
- Abbey-Anne Gyles (born 1997), English model
- Alfred William Gyles (1888–1967), New Zealand chess player
- Althea Gyles (1867–1949), Irish poet
- Ced Gyles (1926–2023), Canadian football player
- George Gyles (1877–1959), Canadian sailor
- Harry Gyles (1880–1959), Australian rules footballer
- Henry Gyles (1640–1709), English glass painter
- John Gyles (1678–1755), American interpreter
- John Gyles (MP) (died 1406), English politician
- Mascal Gyles (1595–1652), English polemic
- Roger Gyles (1938–2025), Australian judge
- Thomas Gyles, English politician

== Given name ==
- Gyles Brandreth (born 1948), English writer
- Gyles Isham (1903–1976), English actor
- Gyles Longley (1918–2015), British officer
- Gyles Mackrell (1889–1959), British tea planter

== See also ==
- Giles (given name)
- Giles (surname)
