= William Crundall =

Timber merchant and politician (1847–1934)

Sir William Crundall
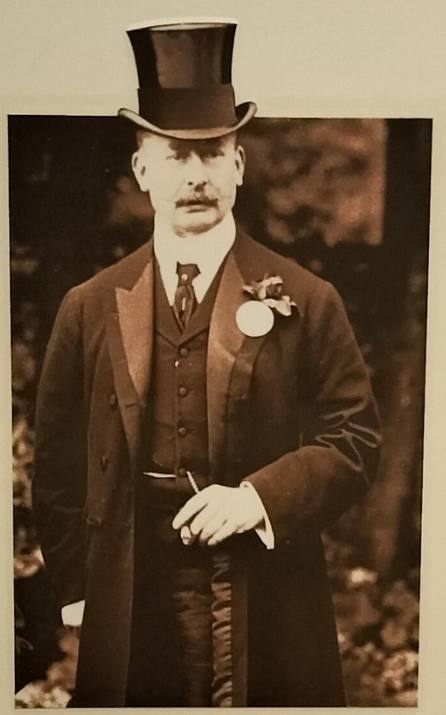

Mayor of Dover
- In office 13x between 1886 – 1910
- Preceded by: William John Adcock (1885, 1890)
- Succeeded by: William Bromley (1911)

Personal details
- Born: June 24(?), 1847 Dover, Kent, England
- Died: February 25, 1934 Dover, Kent, England
- Party: Conservative

Sir William Henry Crundall (1847 ― February 25, 1934) was a wealthy timber merchant and politician from Dover, Kent, England who served as the Mayor of Dover a total of thirteen times between 1886 and 1910.

== Biography ==
William's exact birthdate seems to be lost. It is believed that he was born in 1847, which is seemingly confirmed by his ancestry. However, an article written by Terry Sutton states that "... making a huge impact on Dover, the town where he was born on Midsummer's Day." If this were the case, according to the UK Legal Calendar, William would have been born on June 24.

William was the first of two sons of his father William Crundall senior (d. 1888) and his mother Catherine Amos. His younger brother Albert was born in 1862. William left school at the age of fourteen to begin work. It is said that he later became a volunteer with the East Kent Regiment, retiring from the unit in 1878 with the rank of captain.

In 1883 William was elected to Dover Town Council as a representative of the Castle Ward. Now part of the Town & Castle Parish Ward of the Dover District.

William is most widely known for his street widening projects that were taken during his mayoralties. First assuming office in 1886, he was also associated with introducing the Dover Corporation Electric Trams in 1897. The second system of its kind in England and the company behind the 1917 Crabble Tram Accident. The deadliest tram crash in UK history.

William would serve as the town's mayor for thirteen nonconsecutive terms, them being 1886–1888, 1891–1894, 1897–1900, 1904, and finally in 1910. The most terms served by a Dover mayor in town history. Just ahead of John Halle and John Gyles who both served twelve nonconsecutive terms in the 14th and early 15th centuries. It is worth noting that William was knighted by 1888.

In 1899 author Samuel Statham published The History of the Castle, Town, and Port of Dover, of which was dedicated to William.

It is stated by 1922 William was a deputy lieutenant of Kent. He died on February 25, 1934, likely from some form of flu or possibly pneumonia, simply known as a "fatal chill." Attended by hundreds, his funeral was held in Golders Green, London. As was a simultaneous memorial service in Dover.
