= William Granger =

William Granger may refer to:

- William Granger (MP) (died 1545), Member of Parliament (MP) for Dover
- Bill Granger (1969–2023), cook, restaurateur and food writer
- Bill Granger (author) (1941–2012), American novelist
- William Granger (priest) (1891–?), Dean of Nassau
- W. R. Granger (William Rowen Granger; 1873–1925), Canadian sports administrator

See also:

William Grainger (footballer), professional footballer
