= Hannington =

Hannington may refer to:

== Places in England ==
- Hannington, Hampshire
- Hannington, Northamptonshire
- Hannington, Wiltshire

== People ==
- James Hannington (1847–1885), English bishop of Eastern Equatorial Africa
- Henry Hannington (1797–1870), English cricketer
- Wal Hannington (1896–1966), British Communist
- William Hannington (by 1530–1607), English politician

== Other uses ==
- Hanningtons, former department store, Brighton, England

== See also ==
- Hanington (disambiguation)
