= Monyn =

Monyn is an English surname. Notable people with the surname include:

- John Monyn (before 1376–1419 or after), English MP for Dover and Canterbury
- Thomas Monyn, son of John, MP for Dover (UK Parliament constituency)
