= Braban =

Braban is a surname. Notable people with the surname include:

- Harvey Braban (1883–1943), British stage actor
- John Braban (died c.1443), member of Parliament for Dover

== See also ==
- Braben
