= Thomas Arnold (disambiguation) =

Thomas Arnold (1795–1842) was an English educator and headmaster of Rugby School.

Thomas Arnold may also refer to:

Listed chronologically

- Thomas Arnold (MP) (fl. 1420–1421), British Member of Parliament for Dover
- Thomas Arnold (Royal Navy officer) (1679–1737), English captain in the navy
- Thomas Arnold (silversmith) (1734–1828), American silversmith
- Thomas Arnold (physician) (1742–1816), English physician and writer on mental illness
- Thomas Dickens Arnold (1798–1870), American congressman representing Tennessee
- Thomas Kerchever Arnold (1800–1853), English theologian and writer of educational works
- Thomas James Arnold (c. 1804–1877), English barrister
- Thomas Arnold (educator of the deaf) (1816–1897), British educator and Nonconformist minister
- Tom Arnold (literary scholar) (1823–1900), Thomas Arnold the Younger, son of the educator
- Thomas Arnold (police officer) (1835–1907), London police superintendent involved in the Jack the Ripper investigation
- Thomas Walker Arnold (1864–1930), professor and eminent orientalist
- Thomas J. Arnold (1864–1906), English missionary to China
- Thomas Arnold (bobsleigh) (1901–1986), silver medalist at the 1924 Winter Olympics
