= Pynchon (disambiguation) =

Thomas Pynchon (born 1937) is an American novelist.

Pynchon may also refer to:

- Pynchon (surname), a list of people with the surname
- 152319 Pynchon, a minor planet named after Thomas Pynchon
- Pynchon Park, a former sports venue in Springfield, Massachusetts

== See also ==
- Pyncheon, chicken breed
