= William Leonard =

William or Bill Leonard may refer to:

== Government ==
- William Leonard (English politician) (fl. 1597), MP for Dover
- William Leonard (Scottish politician) (1887–1969), MP for Glasgow St. Rollox, 1931–1950
- J. William Leonard, director of the Information Security Oversight Office
- Bill Leonard (politician) (born 1947), American politician in California
- Billy Leonard (born 1955), Irish republican politician

== Military ==
- William Leonard (Medal of Honor), Medal of Honor recipient during the Plains Indian Wars
- William E. Leonard (1836–1891), Medal of Honor recipient in the American Civil War
- William F. Leonard (1913–1985), recipient of the Medal of Honor
- William N. Leonard (1916–2005), American World War II flying ace and United States Navy admiral

== Others ==
- William Andrew Leonard (1848–1930), American author and prelate of the Episcopal Church
- William Ellery Leonard (1876–1944), American poet
- William J. Leonard (1927–2006), American football player
- Bill Leonard (runner) (born 1923), American miler, 1948 1500 m All-American for the Notre Dame Fighting Irish track and field team
- William Robert Leonard or Bobby Leonard (1932–2021), American basketball player and coach
- Bill Leonard (journalist) (1916–1994), American broadcast journalist
- Bill J. Leonard (born 1946), American historian of religion
