= Sir John Reid, 2nd Baronet =

Scottish merchant and financier (1791–1867)

Sir John Rae Reid, 2nd Baronet (1791–1867) was a Scottish merchant and financier. He was a Tory and Conservative politician who sat in the House of Commons between 1830 and 1847.

== Early life ==
Reid was the son of Sir Thomas Reid of Ewell Grove and his wife Elizabeth Goodfellow. He succeeded his father in the baronetcy in 1824

== Political life ==
Reid was the Member of Parliament for Dover, Kent from 1830 to 1831 and from 1832 to 1847.

== Slave ownership ==
According to the Legacies of British Slave-Ownership at the University College London, Reid was awarded compensation in the aftermath of the Slavery Abolition Act 1833 with the Slave Compensation Act 1837.

Reid was associated with seventeen different claims, he owned over 3000 slaves in British Guiana, Jamaica, St Kitts, Trinidad and the British Virgin Islands. He received over £62,000 in compensation from these claims (worth £6.38 million in 2025).

== Career ==
Reid was head of the firm Reid, Irving & Co., and later a Director (1820 to 1847) of the Bank of England, except when acting as Deputy Governor (1837 to 1839) or Governor (1839 to 1841). In June 2020 the Bank of England issued a public apology for the involvement of Reid, amongst other employees, in the slave trade following the investigation by the Centre for the Study of the Legacies of British Slave-ownership at UCL.

== Personal life ==
He married Maria Louisa, the daughter of Richard Eaton of Stetchworth Park, Cambridgeshire with whom he had 2 sons and a daughter.

Parliament of the United Kingdom
Preceded by Robert Henry Stanhope; Charles Poulett Thomson	Member of Parliament for Dover; 1832 – 1847; With: Charles Poulett Thomson to 1833; John Halcomb 1833–35; John Minet Fector 1835–37; Edward Royd Rice from 1837	Succeeded by Edward Royd Rice; Sir George Clerk
Baronetage of the United Kingdom
Preceded by Thomas Reid	Baronet (of Ewell Grove); 1824 – 1867	Succeeded by John Reid
