= John Garton =

John Garton may refer to:

- John Garton (bishop), British Anglican bishop and theologian
- John Garton (MP), English member of Parliament for Dover
- John Garton (1863–1922), plant breeder and founder of Gartons Limited
