= John Halcomb =

John Halcomb (later Halcombe, 1790 – 3 November 1852) was an English serjeant-at-law, and a Conservative Member of Parliament (MP) for Dover between 1833 and 1835. Of several written works, his most significant was A Practical Treatise of Passing Private Bills through both Houses of Parliament (1836).

Halcomb, who was later known as Halcombe, married Margaret Birch. Their fifth child, Arthur Halcombe, went to New Zealand as an immigration agent under William Fox. The daughter of his brother William, Sarah Holcomb, was the wife of William Fox.

Parliament of the United Kingdom
Preceded by Charles Poulett Thomson; Sir John Rae Reid	Member of Parliament for Dover; 1833 – 1835; With: Sir John Rae Reid	Succeeded by John Minet Fector; Sir John Rae Reid
