= Charles Poulett Thomson, 1st Baron Sydenham =

British Governor General of the Province of Canada (1799–1841)

The Right Honourable The Lord Sydenham GCB PC
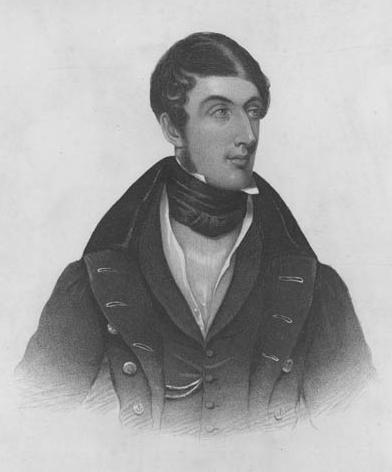

Lieutenant Governor of Upper Canada
- In office 1839–1841
- Monarch: Victoria
- Preceded by: Sir George Arthur, Bt
- Succeeded by: Major General John Clitherow

Governor General of the Province of Canada
- In office 1839–1841
- Monarch: Victoria
- Preceded by: The Earl of Durham GCB
- Succeeded by: Sir Charles Bagot

President of the Board of Trade
- In office 5 June – 14 November 1834
- Monarch: William IV
- Prime Minister: The Earl Grey KG; The Viscount Melbourne
- Preceded by: The Earl of Auckland GCB
- Succeeded by: The Lord Ashburton
- In office 8 April 1835 – 29 August 1839
- Monarchs: William IV; Victoria
- Prime Minister: The Viscount Melbourne
- Preceded by: The Lord Ashburton
- Succeeded by: The Lord Taunton

Personal details
- Born: 13 September 1799 Waverley Abbey, Farnham, Surrey
- Died: 19 September 1841 (aged 42) Kingston, Ontario, Canada
- Party: Whig

Charles Poulett Thomson, 1st Baron Sydenham, GCB, PC (13 September 1799 – 19 September 1841) was a British businessman, politician, diplomat and the first Governor General of the united Province of Canada.

== Early life, family, education ==
Born at Waverley Abbey House, near Farnham, Surrey, Thomson was the son of John Buncombe Poulett Thomson, a London merchant, by his wife Charlotte, daughter of John Jacob. His father was the head of J. Thomson, T. Bonar and Company, a successful trading firm that had dealings with Saint Petersburg, Russian Empire, and was a principal merchant house in the Russian–Baltic trade.

After attending private schools until age 16, Thomson entered the family firm at Saint Petersburg. In 1817 he came home due to poor health, and embarked on a prolonged tour of Southern Europe. He returned to Russia in 1821 and over the next three years travelled extensively in Eastern Europe. He established permanent residence in London in 1824 but frequently visited the Continent, especially Paris.

== Political career ==
Thomson was returned to the House of Commons as MP for Dover in 1826. In 1830 he joined Earl Grey's government as Vice-President of the Board of Trade and Treasurer of the Navy, an office he held until 1834. In November 1831 Thomson accompanied Lord Durham to Paris to negotiate a new commercial treaty with July Monarchy France, but the project was not accomplished. He was then President of the Board of Trade under Lord Melbourne in 1834 and succeeded Lord Auckland as president, and again between 1835 and 1839. A free-trader and an expert in financial matters, he was elected MP for Manchester in 1832, a seat which he held until 1839. He was continuously occupied with negotiations affecting international commerce until 1839, when he accepted the Governorship of Canada. After his appointment as a governor general of British North America, he persuaded the legislature of Upper Canada to consent to a union with Lower Canada, and framed the constitution of the united province. In 1832 he organised a special statistical department at the board of trade, and in 1837 instituted the school of design at Somerset House, in accordance with the recommendation of a select committee of the House of Commons made in 1835.

== Governor General of Canada ==
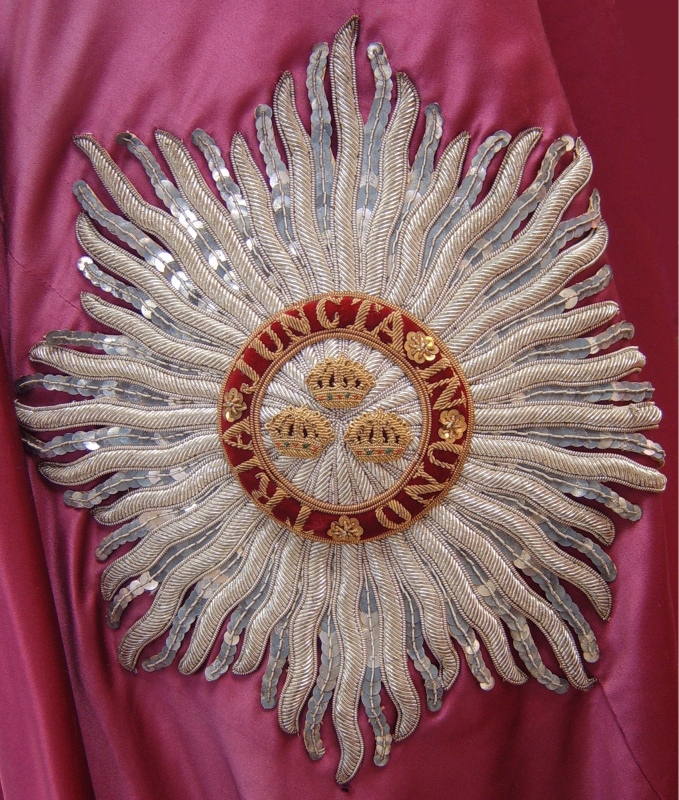
Order of the Bath Knight Grand Cross Breast Star

Sydenham succeeded Lord Durham as Governor General of Canada in 1839. He was responsible for implementing the Union Act in 1840, uniting Upper Canada and Lower Canada as the Province of Canada, and moving the seat of government to Kingston. Upper Canadians were given a choice in the matter of union, which they accepted; Lower Canada had no say, and as a result, many French Canadians were opposed to both the union and Sydenham himself.

Later that year, he was raised to the peerage as Baron Sydenham, of Sydenham in the County of Kent and of Toronto in Canada and was appointed knight grand cross of the Order of the Bath.

Sydenham was just as anti-French as Lord Durham had been, and he encouraged British immigration to make the French Canadian population less significant. French Canadians referred to him as le poulet, "the chicken". Realising he had almost no support in Lower Canada (at this time Canada East), he reorganised electoral ridings to allow Anglo-Canadians to elect more members (such as by hiving French sections of Montreal out to outlying counties and reducing ability of property owners to cast plural votes). Where that was not feasible, he allowed Orangeman mobs to beat up French candidates. Louis-Hippolyte Lafontaine was one such candidate who suffered from Sydenham's influence. Montreal and Quebec city elected a clean sweep of English members in the first election in the united province. Lafontaine soon left Canada East to work with Robert Baldwin in creating a fairer union for both sides.

A new constitution uniting the two colonies was carried through the colonial parliaments and ratified by the British House of Commons. It came into force on 10 February 1841. It led ultimately to the great confederation of 1867. In addition to this measure he carried another for local government, and he produced improvements in the matters of emigration, education, and public works. Charles Greville, in his Memoirs wrote about Thomson:

In spite of his vanity he had many admirable qualities: tact, judgment, and prudence, firmness and decision, indefatigable and well-ordered application, and, above all, a disinterested devotion to the service of his country.

Sydenham was accused of fomenting the Tory violence that marred the election of the 1st Parliament of the Province of Canada.

Sydenham also settled the Protestant land dispute over the clergy reserves in Upper Canada (at this time Canada West), which the Family Compact had interpreted to refer only to the Anglican Church. Sydenham convinced the legislators to pass an Act whereby half of the land set aside for Protestant churches would be shared between Anglicans and Presbyterians, and the other half would be shared between the other Protestant denominations.

Sydenham worked to make Canada financially viable so that there would be less danger of annexation by the United States. He worked on this policy throughout the 1830s, when he was President of the Board of Trade in Britain. But he did not implement any economic reforms once he arrived in Canada.

=== Death ===
After less than two years as Governor General, Sydenham died in 1841, at age 42. He had been described as sickly and an autopsy revealed severe gout. Shortly before his death, he had resigned his position and was due to return to England within weeks. However, on 4 September, Sydenham was

riding a spirited horse near Parliament House, but could not, for a long time, get the animal to pass that building. After a severe application of spur and whip, however, the horse proceeded, but immediately after, put his foot upon a large stone ... not being able to recover, fell and dragged his rider with him, fracturing the leg, and lacerating it above the knee.

This apparently led to a deadly infection. For fifteen days, Sydenham was described as suffering extreme pain, then died the morning of 19 September 1841. As he was unmarried, his peerage became extinct. He was buried at Kingston, in the crypt of St George's Cathedral.

=== Legacy ===
==== Owen Sound ====
Soon after its founding, the present-day city of Owen Sound, Ontario, was named Sydenham in 1842 in honour of the recently deceased Governor of Canada; in 1856, the community became a town and was renamed Owen Sound after the adjacent body of water. Sydenham is the name of the principal river that runs through Owen Sound. Sydenham was also the name of the former Township of Sydenham, which bordered Owen Sound to the east, and in 2001 amalgamated into the municipality of Meaford, Ontario. Sydenham Community School is in Owen Sound. For more than half a century, Owen Sound's main street was called Poulett Street; in 1909, the community's street names were renumbered on the New York City model, and Poulett Street became 2nd Avenue East.

==== Kingston ====
Sydenham Public School in Kingston, Ontario, which has operated as an educational facility since its construction in 1853 as the Kingston County Grammar School, was renamed in the 1890s in memory of Lord Sydenham. It is in downtown Kingston, and is an Ontario-designated heritage building.

Sydenham High School, Ontario, a regional high school, is in the village of Sydenham, Frontenac County, Ontario, northwest of Kingston.

Sydenham Street, in downtown Kingston, runs north-south, and is a two-section street. Its southern section runs from West Street to Brock Street. Its northern section runs from Princess Street to Raglan Road. The two sections are separated by a block of buildings between Brock and Princess Streets.

Sydenham Road, also in Kingston, runs from outer Princess Street northwards to Highway 401 and beyond, to the village of Sydenham.

Sydenham Ward, a municipal electoral district in Kingston, is one of twelve such districts in the city, and this designation has been used in Kingston municipal politics since the 1840s, albeit with its boundaries modified several times over the ensuing years.

The Old Sydenham Heritage Conservation District, in the southeastern sector of Downtown Kingston, was formally designated by the city council on 24 March 2015.

==== Rest of Ontario ====
Sydenham Street in Simcoe, Ontario, is named in his honour.

Sydenham Street in London, Ontario, which runs between Wellington and Talbot Streets, north of Oxford Street, is also named after him.

Dixie was once named Sydenham.

==== Memoirs ====
His memoirs were published by his brother, G. J. Poulett Scrope, in 1844.

== Bibliography ==
- Buckner, Phillip. "Thomson, Charles Edward Poulett, 1st Baron Sydenham", in Dictionary of Canadian Biography Online, Université Laval and University of Toronto, 2000
- Knaplund, Paul, ed. (1973). Letters from Lord Sydenham, Governor-General of Canada, 1839–1841, to Lord John Russell, New York: A. M. Kelley, 180 p.
- Shortt, Adam (1908). Lord Sydenham, Toronto: Morang & Co., Limited, 367 p. (online)
- Scrope, George Poulett and Charles Edward Poulett Thomson Sydenham (1844) Memoir of the Life of the Right Honourable Charles, Lord Sydenham, G. C. B.: With a Narrative of His Administration in Canada, London: John Murray, 403 p. (online)
- Portraits of Charles Poulett-Thomson, Baron Sydenham at the National Portrait Gallery, London
- Lee, Sidney, ed. (1898). "Thomson, Charles Edward Poulett" . Dictionary of National Biography. Vol. 56. London: Smith, Elder & Co.

Parliament of the United Kingdom
Preceded by Joseph Butterworth; Edward Bootle-Wilbraham	Member of Parliament for Dover; 1826–1833; With: Edward Bootle-Wilbraham to 1828; William Henry Trant 1828–1830; Sir John Reid, Bt 1830–1831; Captain Robert Stanhope 1831–1832; Sir John Reid, Bt from 1832	Succeeded by John Halcomb; Sir John Reid, Bt
New constituency	Member of Parliament for Manchester; 1832-1839; With: Mark Philips	Succeeded by Mark Philips; Robert Hyde Greg
Political offices
Preceded by Thomas Courtenay	Vice-President of the Board of Trade; 1830–1834	Succeeded by Viscount Lowther
Preceded by Sir Thomas Lewis, Bt	Treasurer of the Navy; 1830–1834	Succeeded by Viscount Lowther
Preceded by The Lord Auckland	President of the Board of Trade; 1834	Succeeded by Alexander Baring
Preceded by Alexander Baring	President of the Board of Trade; 1835–1839	Succeeded by Henry Labouchere
Preceded by The Earl of Durham	Governor General of the Province of Canada; 1839–1841	Succeeded by Sir Charles Bagot
Academic offices
Preceded by Sir George Arthur, Bt	Chancellor of King's College Toronto; 1841	Succeeded by Sir Charles Bagot
Peerage of the United Kingdom
New creation	Baron Sydenham; 1840–1841	Extinct
