= Alkham (disambiguation) =

Alkham is a village in Kent, England.

Alkham may also refer to:

- John Alkham (1354–c.1433), English member of parliament for Dover
- Alkham Valley, a valley in the Kent Downs, England
