= Joseph Beverley =

Joseph Beverley may refer to:

- Joe Beverley (1856–1897), English footballer
- Joseph Beverley (MP) (died 1561), English politician
