= Tom Arnold =

Tom Arnold may refer to:

- Tom Arnold (actor) (born 1959), American actor
- Tom Arnold (economist) (born 1948), Irish CEO of Concern Worldwide
- Tom Arnold (footballer) (1878–?), English footballer
- Tom Arnold (literary scholar) (1823–1900), British academic, son of Thomas Arnold of Rugby
- Tom Arnold (politician) (1947–2023), Conservative politician in the United Kingdom
- Tom Arnold (theatre impresario) (1897–1969), British theatrical producer

== See also ==
- Thomas Arnold (disambiguation)
