= The History of the Castle, Town, and Port of Dover =

1899 book by S. P. H. Statham

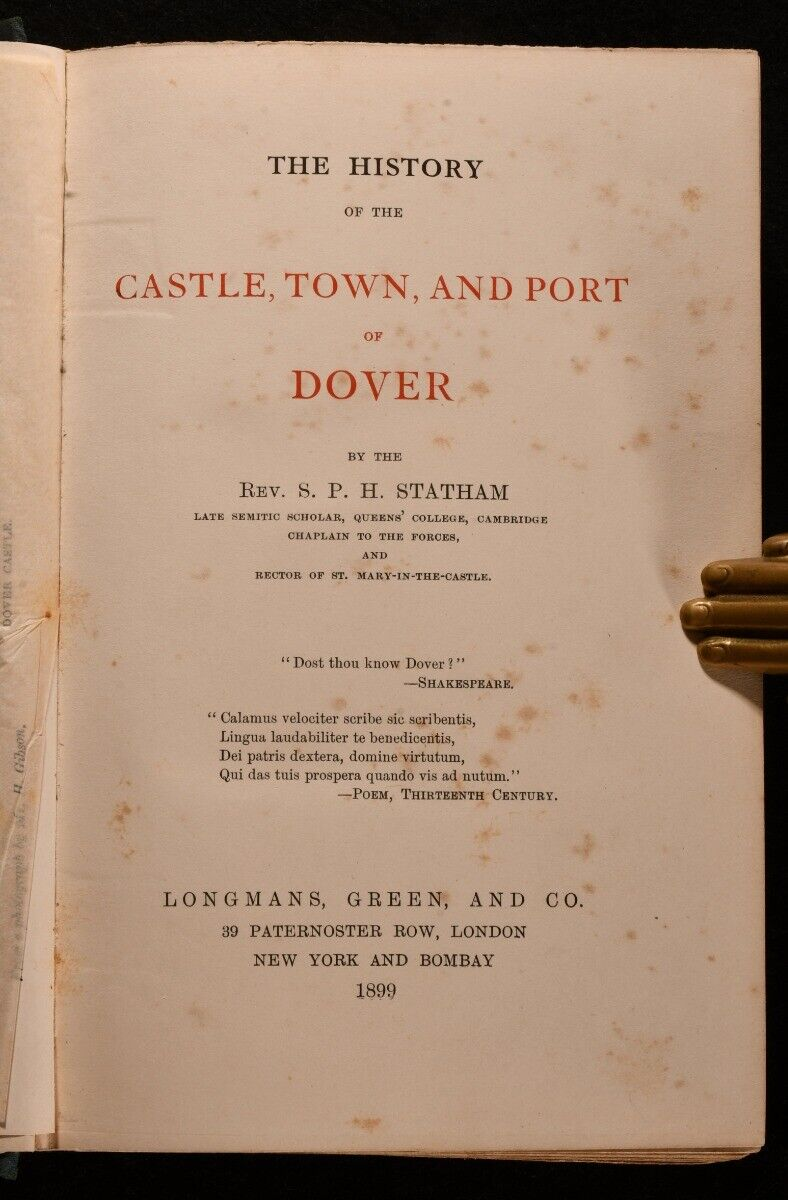
- Author: Samuel Percy Hammond Statham
- Language: English
- Published: 1899
- Publication place: City of London, England

The History of the Castle, Town, and Port of Dover is a nearly complete work of the history of Dover, Kent, England from Julius Caesar's invasions of Britain to 1899 by Queen's College scholar Samuel Statham.

== Contents ==
Statham discusses every Warden of the Cinque Ports and Constable of Dover Castle from Odo de Bayeux to Robert Gascoyne-Cecil, of which includes an additional 26 individuals who may have or may have not held the position or one of similar standing. Covering a period from the Norman invasion of England in 1066 until 1895. As well as other lieutenants dating back to the reign of Æthelred the Unready. The text also includes a semi-complete list of the mayors of the town from 1258 to 1899. The text was dedicated to William Crundall, the then present Mayor of Dover during his ninth term in office. The text was published by the Longmans, Green & Co. publishing company in the City of London in 1899.

The title page references William Shakespeare's 1606 play, King Lear Act 4, Scene 1 that states "Dost thou know Dover?" In addition to a portion of a 13th-century Latin poem known as The Song of Lewes, likely written by a cleric associated with the House of Montfort.

Samuel Statham
- Born: 12 November 1825; England
- Died: 25 September 1902 (aged 76); Wellsville, Utah, United States
