= Edward Stephens =

Edward Stephens may refer to:

- Edward Stephens (MP for Dover) (c. 1552–?), English politician
- Edward Stephens (MP for Tewkesbury and Gloucestershire) (1597–c. 1670), English lawyer and politician
- Edward Stephens (Royal Navy Lieutenant), see List of ships captured in the 19th century
- Edward Bowring Stephens (1815–1882), English sculptor
- Edward Stephen (1822–1895), also known as Stephens, Welsh minister and composer
- Edward S. Stephens (1849–1909), American educator
- Edward Stephens (Australian settler) (1811–1861), early Australian settler
- Eddie Stevens, musician, member of Moloko & collaborator with Róisín Murphy

== See also ==
- Edward Stevens (disambiguation)
