= Merley (disambiguation) =

Merley is a housing estate in Poole, England.

Merley may also refer to:

- Merley House, Wimborne, a house in Wimborne, England
- Henry Merley (died c.1415), member of Parliament for Dover
- Merley Cobham Sports F.C., sport club
