= Portway =

Portway or Port Way may refer to:

== Places in England ==
- Portway, Worcestershire, a hamlet in Beoley parish, near Redditch

== Roads in England ==
- Port Way, a Roman road between London and Weymouth
- Portway, Bristol, a road from Bristol to Avonmouth
- Derbyshire Portway, an ancient track
- H5 Portway, part of the grid road system in Milton Keynes

== Sporting clubs ==
- Portway Bristol F.C., a defunct football team

== Transport infrastructure ==
- Portway Park & Ride, bus service in Bristol, England
- Portway Park & Ride railway station in Bristol, England

== People ==
- Joshua Portway (born 1967), British artist and game designer
- Thomas Portway (by 1524–1557), English politician
