= Pinchon =

Pinchon is a French surname. Notable people with the surname include:

- Robert Antoine Pinchon (1886–1943), French Post-Impressionist landscape painter
- Émile Pinchon, French sculptor
- John Pinchon (d. 1573), English Member of Parliament
- Joseph Pinchon (1871–1953), French illustrator, co-creator of the comic strip heroine Bécassine
- William Pinchon (1175–1234), Bishop of Saint-Brieuc, Brittany, France

== See also ==
- Pynchon (surname)
