= Dover and Deal =

Parliamentary constituency in the United Kingdom, 1369 onwards

Coordinates: 51.18°N 1.31°E

- County constituency for the House of Commons
- Interactive map of boundaries from 2024
- Boundary of Dover and Deal in South East England
- Local government in South East England: Kent
- Electorate: 75,855 (2023)
- Major settlements: Dover and Deal

Current constituency
- Created: 1918 (as Dover)
- Member of Parliament: Mike Tapp (Labour)
- Seats: One
- Created from: St Augustine's and Dover (borough)
- During its existence contributed to new seat(s) of: South Thanet (1983)

Dover
- Former borough constituency for the House of Commons
- Local government in South East England: Kent
- Major settlements: Dover

1885–1918
- Seats: One
- Replaced by: Dover (County)

1369–1885
- Seats: Two
- Type of constituency: borough constituency

Dover and Deal is a constituency in the House of Commons of the UK Parliament. It has been represented since 2024 by Mike Tapp of the Labour Party.

It was known as Dover until 1974 and from 1983 until 2024. Following the 2023 Periodic Review of Westminster constituencies, the seat reverted to its current name, and was first contested at the 2024 general election.

Dover was considered a Cinque Ports constituency from 1386 to 1832.

== Constituency profile ==
The seat includes most of Dover District. It comprises the towns of Deal, Dover, Walmer and surrounding villages in a productive chalkland, long-cultivated area adjoining the Strait of Dover.

Since 1945 Dover has been a Labour/Conservative swing seat. In local elections, most of its rural villages and the two small towns favour the Conservative Party, whereas Dover favours the Labour Party, as well as the former mixed mining and agricultural villages in the local coal belt (East Kent coalfield), such as Aylesham. Labour's vote held on very solidly here in 2005, but the seat went Conservative in the 2010 election on a swing of 10.4% compared with a 4.9% swing nationally.

Electoral Calculus categorises the seat as being part of the “Strong Right” demographic, those who have fiscally conservative views on the economy but are also fairly nationalist and socially conservative, alongside strong support for Brexit. In addition to this, around 55% of Dover and Deal is deprived, in terms of employment, income and education, with 47% of the local population, in particular, being unemployed, according to the site. For general statistics, the average age is 52.4, at least 80% of the local population owns a car, whilst 67% own a home, and the gross household income is £41,120.

== Cinque Port seat ==
Dover's representation was originally as a Cinque Port constituency. In the sixteenth and seventeenth centuries, the Lord Warden of the Cinque Ports nominated one member, as with other Cinque Ports, but this was outlawed by the Parliamentary Elections Act 1689 (2 Will. & Mar. c. 7). There was still some residual influence, but there was also a local independent element in the borough, with two local leading families, the Papillons and Furneses, starting to send MPs to Parliament. By the mid eighteenth century, it had come under more government authority through the influence of the Earl of Hardwicke, although government control was often more fragile than it seemed.

Dover lost its status as a Cinque Port seat, becoming a borough seat under the Reform Act 1832 (2 & 3 Will. 4. c. 45).

== Boundaries ==
Map of boundaries 2010–2024

1918–1950: The Boroughs of Dover and Deal, the Urban District of Walmer, and the Rural Districts of Dover and Eastry.

1950–1983: The Boroughs of Dover, Deal, and Sandwich, the Rural District of Dover, and the Rural District of Eastry, except the parishes included in the Isle of Thanet constituency.

1983–2010: The District of Dover wards of Aylesham, Barton, Buckland, Capel-le-Ferne, Castle, Cornilo, Eastry, Eythorne, Lower Walmer, Lydden and Temple Ewell, Maxton and Elms Vale, Middle Deal, Mill Hill, Mongeham, Noninstone, North Deal, Pineham, Priory, Ringwould, River, St Margaret's-at-Cliffe, St Radigund's, Shepherdswell with Coldred, Tower Hamlets, Town and Pier, and Upper Walmer.

2010–2024: The District of Dover wards of Aylesham, Buckland, Capel-le-Ferne, Castle, Eastry, Eythorne and Shepherdswell, Lydden and Temple Ewell, Maxton, Elms Vale and Priory, Middle Deal and Sholden, Mill Hill, North Deal, Ringwould, River, St Margaret's-at-Cliffe, St Radigund's, Tower Hamlets, Town and Pier, Walmer, and Whitfield.

2024–present: The District of Dover wards of Alkham & Capel-le-Ferne, Aylesham, Eythorne & Shepherdswell, Buckland, Dover Downs & River, Eastry Rural, Guston, Kingsdown & St. Margaret's-at-Cliffe, Maxton & Elms Vale, Middle Deal, Mill Hill, North Deal, St. Radigunds, Tower Hamlets, Town & Castle, Walmer, and Whitfield.

Minor changes due to revision of ward boundaries.

== Members of Parliament ==
=== Cinque Port/Parliamentary Borough 1386–1918 ===
==== MPs 1386–1660 ====
Parliament	First member	Second member
1386	John Gyles	John Halle I
1388 (Feb)	John Gyles	John Halle I
1388 (Sep)	John Gyles	John Monyn
1390 (Jan)	John Gyles	John Monyn
1390 (Nov)		
1391	John Gyles	John Strete
1393	John Gyles	John Strete
1394		
1395	John Gyles	John Strete
1397 (Jan)	Nicholas Spicer	John Monyn
1397 (Sep)	John Monyn I	
1399	John Gyles	John Enebrook
1401		
1402	Thomas Gyles	John Strete
1404 (Jan)		
1404 (Oct)		
1406	Thomas Gyles	Henry Merley
1407	John Alkham	Henry Merley
1410	Nicholas Spicer	Peter Rede
1411	Thomas Monyn	
1413 (Feb)		
1413 (May)	Thomas Monyn	John Garton
1414 (Apr)		
1414 (Nov)	Walter Stratton	John Garton
1415		
1416 (Mar)		
1416 (Oct)	John Braban	
1417	John Braban	Thomas atte Crowche
1419	John Braban	Walter Stratton
1420	Thomas Arnold	Thomas atte Crowche
1421 (May)	Thomas Arnold	John Braban
1421 (Dec)	John Braban	Walter Stratton
1439–1444	Sir Thomas Browne	
1470	Thomas Smith	
1510	John Warren	not known
1512	Nicholas Templeman	John Warren
1515	Nicholas Templeman	John Warren
1523	Thomas Vaughan	Robert Nethersole
1529	Robert Nethersole	John Warren
1536	Robert Nethersole	John Warren
1539	Thomas Vaughan	John Payntor
1542	John Warren	William Granger
1545	Edmund Mody	John Warren
1547	Joseph Beverley	Thomas Warren
1553 (Mar)	Henry Crispe	Thomas Portway
1553 (Oct)	Joseph Beverley	John Webbe
1554 (Apr)	John Webbe	Thomas Colly
1554 (Nov)	William Hannington	John Webbe
1555	Thomas Warren	Sir Edmund Rous
1558	Joseph Beverley	John Cheyne
1559	Thomas Warren	John Robins
1562–3	John Robins	Thomas Warren
1571	Thomas Andrews II	John Pinchon
1572	Thomas Andrews II	Thomas Warren
1584	Richard Barrey	John Moore
1586	Richard Barrey	John Moore
1588	Thomas Fane	Edward Stephens
1593	Thomas Fane	Thomas Elwood
1597	Thomas Fane	William Leonard
1601	George Fane	George Newman
1604	Sir Thomas Waller	George Bing
1614	Sir George Fane	Sir Robert Brett
1621	Sir Henry Mainwaring	Sir Richard Young
1624	Sir Edward Cecil	Sir Richard Young
1625	Sir John Hippisley	William Beecher
1626	Sir John Hippisley	John Pringle
1628	Sir John Hippisley	Edward Nicholas

No parliament called between 1629 and 1640

Parliament	First member	Second member
1640 (Apr)	Sir Edward Boys	Sir Peter Heyman
1640 (Nov)	Sir Edward Boys	Benjamin Weston
1645	John Dixwell	Benjamin Weston
1648	John Dixwell	Benjamin Weston
1653	Dover not represented in Barebones Parliament	
1654	William Cullen	one seat only
1656	Thomas Kelsey	one seat only
1658	John Dixwell	Thomas Kelsey
1659	John Dixwell	Benjamin Weston

==== MPs 1660–1885 ====
Year	First member	First party	Second member	Second party
April 1660	Edward Montagu		Arnold Braemes	
August 1660	George Montagu		Arnold Braemes	
1661	George Montagu		Sir Francis Vincent, Bt	
1670	George Montagu		Edward Montagu	
1673	George Montagu		Admiral Sir Edward Spragge	
1674	George Montagu		Thomas Papillon	
1679	William Stokes		Thomas Papillon	
1685	Arthur Herbert		William Chapman	
1689	Sir Basil Dixwell, Bt		Thomas Papillon	
1690	James Chadwick		Thomas Papillon	
1695	James Chadwick		Sir Basill Dixwell, Bt	
1697	Admiral Matthew Aylmer		Sir Basill Dixwell, Bt	
January 1701	Admiral Matthew Aylmer		Sir Charles Hedges	
November 1701	Admiral Matthew Aylmer		Philip Papillon	
1710	Sir William Hardres, Bt		Philip Papillon	
1715	Admiral Matthew Aylmer		Philip Papillon	
1720	George Berkeley		Henry Furnese	
1734	David Papillon		Thomas Revell	
1741	Lord George Sackville		Thomas Revell	
1752	Lord George Sackville		William Cayley	
1755	Lord George Sackville		Peter Burrell	
1756	Lord George Sackville		Hugh Valence Jones	
1759	Lord George Sackville		Sir Edward Simpson	
1761	Hon. Sir Joseph Yorke		Sir Edward Simpson	
1765	Hon. Sir Joseph Yorke		John Campbell	
1766	Hon. Sir Joseph Yorke		John Bindley	
1768	Hon. Sir Joseph Yorke		George Villiers	
1770	Hon. Sir Joseph Yorke		Sir Thomas Hales, Bt	
1773	Hon. Sir Joseph Yorke		Thomas Barret	
1774	John Henniker		John Trevanion	
1784	Robert Preston	Tory	Captain the Hon. James Luttrell	Tory
1789	Robert Preston	Tory	John Trevanion	Whig
1790	Charles Pybus	Tory	John Trevanion	Whig
1802	John Spencer Smith	Whig	John Trevanion	Whig
1806	John Jackson	Whig	Charles Jenkinson	Tory
1818	John Jackson	Whig	Edward Bootle-Wilbraham	Tory
1820	Joseph Butterworth	Whig	Edward Bootle-Wilbraham	Tory
1826	Charles Poulett Thomson	Whig	Edward Bootle-Wilbraham	Tory
1828	Charles Poulett Thomson	Whig	William Henry Trant	Tory
1830	Charles Poulett Thomson	Whig	Sir John Reid, Bt	Tory
1831	Charles Poulett Thomson	Whig	Robert Henry Stanhope	Whig
1832	Charles Poulett Thomson	Whig	Sir John Reid, Bt	Tory
1833	John Halcomb	Tory	Sir John Reid, Bt	Tory
1834	John Halcomb	Conservative	Sir John Reid, Bt	Conservative
1835	John Minet Fector	Conservative	Sir John Reid, Bt	Conservative
1837	Edward Royd Rice	Whig	Sir John Reid, Bt	Conservative
1847	Edward Royd Rice	Whig	Sir George Clerk, Bt	Conservative
1852	Edward Royd Rice	Whig	Henry Cadogan	Conservative
1857	Ralph Bernal Osborne	Radical	Sir William Russell, Bt	Whig
1859	Sir Henry Leeke	Conservative	William Nicol	Conservative
1865	Alexander George Dickson	Conservative	Charles Freshfield	Conservative
1868	Alexander George Dickson	Conservative	George Jessel	Liberal
1873	Alexander George Dickson	Conservative	Edward William Barnett	Conservative
1874	Alexander George Dickson	Conservative	Charles Freshfield	Conservative
1885	Representation reduced to one member			

==== MPs 1885–1918 ====
Year	Member	Party	Notes
1885	Alexander George Dickson	Conservative	Died July 1889
1889 by-election	George Wyndham	Conservative	Died June 1913
1913 by-election	Vere Ponsonby	Conservative	Contested Dover (county) following redistribution
1918	Constituency abolished – name transferred to county constituency		

=== County constituency 1918–present ===
Year	Member	Party	Notes
1918	Vere Ponsonby	Conservative	Succeeded to the peerage as 9th Earl of Bessborough
1921 by-election	Sir Thomas Polson	Anti-Waste League	
1922	John Jacob Astor	Conservative	
1945	John Thomas	Labour	
1950	John Arbuthnot	Conservative	
1964	David Ennals	Labour	
1970 (Note: Seat known as Dover and Deal (1974–1983))	Peter Rees	Conservative	Chief Secretary to the Treasury (1983–1985)
1987	David Shaw	Conservative	
1997	Gwyn Prosser	Labour	
2010	Charlie Elphicke	Conservative	
2017	Charlie Elphicke	Independent	
2018	Charlie Elphicke	Conservative	
July 2019	Charlie Elphicke	Independent	
Dec 2019	Natalie Elphicke	Conservative	
May 2024	Natalie Elphicke	Labour	
Jul 2024	Mike Tapp	Labour	Parliamentary Under-Secretary of State for Migration and Citizenship (2025–2026)

== Elections ==
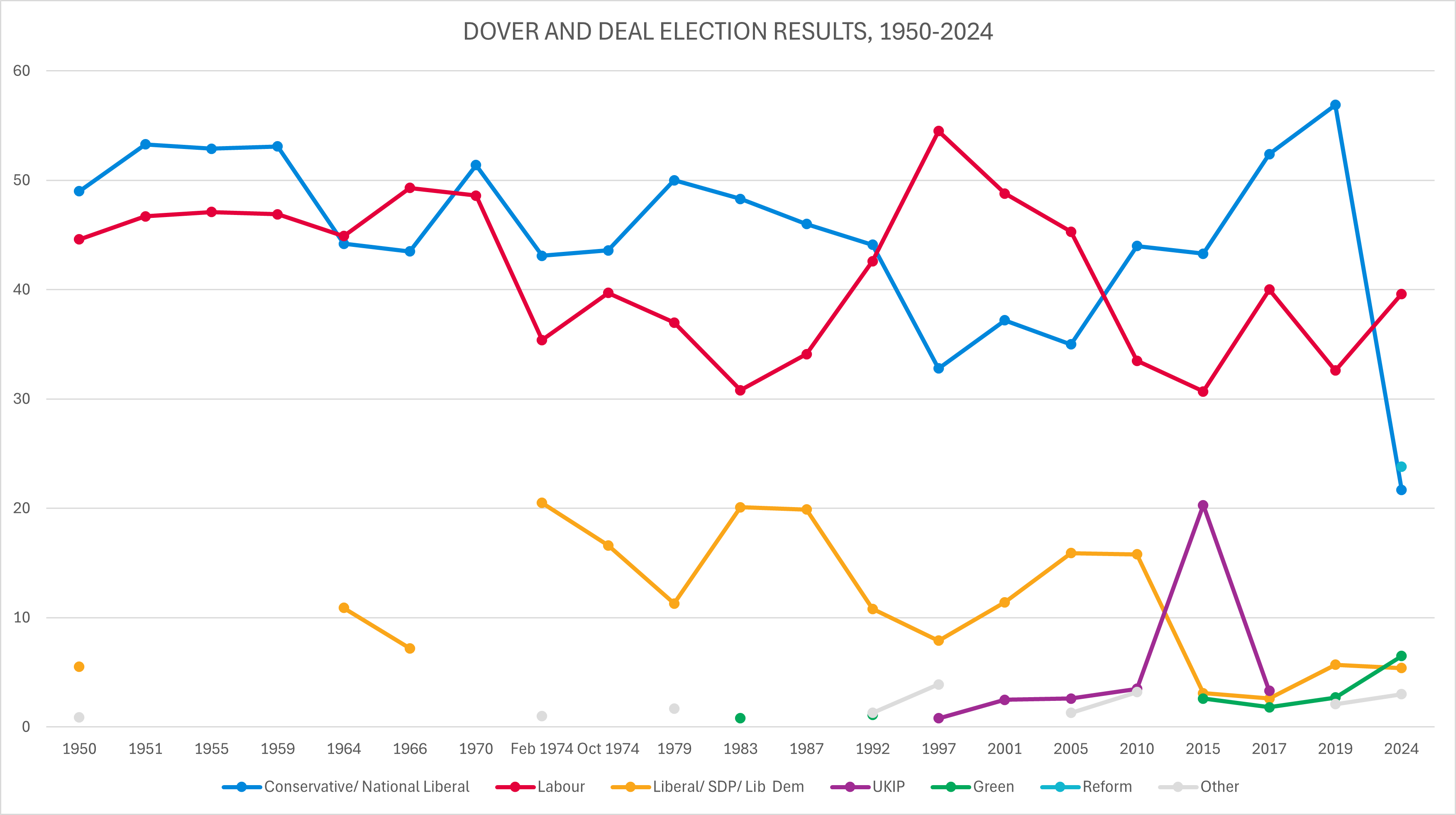
Election results 1950-2024

=== Elections in the 2020s ===
General election 2024: Dover and Deal
Party	Candidate	Votes	%	±%
Labour	Mike Tapp	18,940	39.6	+7.0
Reform	Howard Cox	11,355	23.8	N/A
Conservative	Stephen James	10,370	21.7	−35.2
Green	Christine Oliver	3,106	6.5	+3.8
Liberal Democrats	Penelope James	2,595	5.4	−0.3
Independent	Geoffrey Lymer	485	1.0	N/A
Independent	Ash Payne	369	0.8	N/A
English Democrat	Steve Laws	185	0.4	N/A
Heritage	Sylvia Petersen	168	0.4	N/A
Independent	Chris Tough	104	0.2	N/A
Workers Party	Colin Tasker	98	0.2	N/A
Majority		7,559	15.8	N/A
Turnout		47,775	62.5	−5.0
Registered electors		78,801		
Labour gain from Conservative		Swing	+21.1	

2019 notional result
Party	Vote	%
Conservative	29,117	56.9
Labour	16,696	32.6
Liberal Democrats	2,927	5.7
Green	1,404	2.7
Others	1,053	2.1
Turnout	51,197	67.5
Electorate	75,855	

=== Elections in the 2010s ===
General election 2019: Dover
Party	Candidate	Votes	%	±%
Conservative	Natalie Elphicke	28,830	56.9	+4.5
Labour	Charlotte Cornell	16,552	32.6	−7.4
Liberal Democrats	Simon Dodd	2,895	5.7	+3.1
Green	Beccy Sawbridge	1,371	2.7	+0.9
Independent	Nathan Sutton	916	1.8	N/A
Women's Equality	Eljai Morais	137	0.3	N/A
Majority		12,278	24.3	+11.9
Turnout		50,701	66.4	−3.3
Conservative hold		Swing	+5.9	

General election 2017: Dover
Party	Candidate	Votes	%	±%
Conservative	Charlie Elphicke	27,211	52.4	+9.1
Labour	Stacey Blair	20,774	40.0	+9.3
UKIP	Piers Wauchope	1,723	3.3	−17.0
Liberal Democrats	Simon Dodd	1,336	2.6	−0.5
Green	Beccy Sawbridge	923	1.8	−0.8
Majority		6,437	12.4	−0.1
Turnout		51,966	69.7	+0.8
Conservative hold		Swing		

General election 2015: Dover
Party	Candidate	Votes	%	±%
Conservative	Charlie Elphicke	21,737	43.3	−0.7
Labour	Clair Hawkins	15,443	30.7	−2.8
UKIP	David Little	10,177	20.3	+16.8
Liberal Democrats	Sarah Smith	1,572	3.1	−12.7
Green	Jolyon Trimingham	1,295	2.6	N/A
Majority		6,294	12.5	+2.0
Turnout		50,224	68.9	−1.2
Conservative hold		Swing	+1.0	

General election 2010: Dover
Party	Candidate	Votes	%	±%
Conservative	Charlie Elphicke	22,174	44.0	+9.1
Labour	Gwyn Prosser	16,900	33.5	−11.8
Liberal Democrats	John Brigden	7,962	15.8	0.0
UKIP	Victor Matcham	1,747	3.5	+0.8
BNP	Dennis Whiting	1,104	2.2	N/A
English Democrat	Mike Walters	216	0.4	N/A
CPA	David Clark	200	0.4	N/A
Independent	George Lee-Delisle	82	0.2	N/A
Majority		5,274	10.5	N/A
Turnout		50,385	70.1	+2.8
Conservative gain from Labour		Swing	+10.5	

2005 notional result
Party	Vote	%
Labour	21,833	45.3
Conservative	16,828	35.0
Liberal Democrats	7,605	15.8
UKIP	1,273	2.6
Others	606	1.3
Turnout	48,145	67.3
Electorate	71,518	

=== Elections in the 2000s ===
General election 2005: Dover
Party	Candidate	Votes	%	±%
Labour	Gwyn Prosser	21,680	45.3	−3.5
Conservative	Paul Watkins	16,739	35.0	−2.2
Liberal Democrats	Antony Hook	7,607	15.9	+4.5
UKIP	Mike Wiltshire	1,252	2.6	+0.1
Independent	Victor Matcham	606	1.3	N/A
Majority		4,941	10.3	−1.3
Turnout		47,884	67.6	+2.5
Labour hold		Swing	-0.6	

General election 2001: Dover
Party	Candidate	Votes	%	±%
Labour	Gwyn Prosser	21,943	48.8	−5.7
Conservative	Paul Watkins	16,744	37.2	+4.4
Liberal Democrats	Antony Hook	5,131	11.4	+3.5
UKIP	Lee Speakman	1,142	2.5	+1.7
Majority		5,199	11.6	−10.1
Turnout		44,960	65.1	−13.8
Labour hold		Swing		

=== Elections in the 1990s ===
General election 1997: Dover
Party	Candidate	Votes	%	±%
Labour	Gwyn Prosser	29,535	54.5	+11.9
Conservative	David Shaw	17,796	32.8	−11.3
Liberal Democrats	Mark B. Corney	4,302	7.9	−2.9
Referendum	Susan L. Anderson	2,124	3.9	N/A
UKIP	C. Hyde	443	0.8	N/A
Majority		11,739	21.7	N/A
Turnout		54,200	78.9	−4.6
Labour gain from Conservative		Swing	-11.3	

1992 notional result
Party	Vote	%
Conservative	25,443	44.1
Labour	24,583	42.6
Liberal Democrats	6,234	10.8
Others	1,422	2.5
Turnout	57,682	82.8
Electorate	69,646	

General election 1992: Dover
Party	Candidate	Votes	%	±%
Conservative	David Shaw	25,395	44.1	−1.9
Labour	Gwyn Prosser	24,562	42.6	+8.5
Liberal Democrats	M. J. Sole	6,212	10.8	−9.1
Green	A. C. W. Sullivan	637	1.1	N/A
Ind. Conservative	P. W. Sherred	407	0.7	N/A
Ind. Conservative	B. J. Philp	250	0.4	N/A
Natural Law	C. F. Percy	127	0.2	N/A
Majority		833	1.5	−10.4
Turnout		57,590	83.5	+3.7
Conservative hold		Swing	−5.2	

=== Elections in the 1980s ===
General election 1987: Dover
Party	Candidate	Votes	%	±%
Conservative	David Shaw	25,343	46.0	−2.3
Labour	Stephen Love	18,802	34.1	+3.3
SDP (Liberal)	Geoffrey Nice	10,942	19.9	−0.2
Majority		6,541	11.9	−5.6
Turnout		55,087	79.8	+2.2
Conservative hold		Swing		

General election 1983: Dover
Party	Candidate	Votes	%	±%
Conservative	Peter Rees	25,454	48.3	
Labour	Stephen Love	16,234	30.8	
SDP (Liberal)	Geoffrey Nice	10,601	20.1	
Ecology	M. Potter	404	0.8	N/A
Majority		9,220	17.5	
Turnout		52,693	77.6	
Conservative hold		Swing		

1979 notional result
Party	Vote	%
Conservative	25,974	48.3
Labour	20,799	38.7
Liberal	6,067	11.3
Others	896	1.7
Turnout	53,736	
Electorate		

=== Elections in the 1970s ===
General election 1979: Dover and Deal
Party	Candidate	Votes	%	±%
Conservative	Peter Rees	30,606	50.01	
Labour	Jane Chapman	22,664	37.04	
Liberal	J. Cohen	6,906	11.29	
Silly Party	Jeremy Fox	642	1.05	N/A
National Front	P. Johnson	378	0.62	N/A
Majority		7,942	12.97	
Turnout		61,196	80.65	
Conservative hold		Swing		

General election October 1974: Dover and Deal
Party	Candidate	Votes	%	±%
Conservative	Peter Rees	25,647	43.63	
Labour	L. J. A. Bishop	23,353	39.74	
Liberal	R. S. Young	9,767	16.63	
Majority		2,294	3.89	
Turnout		58,767	78.67	
Conservative hold		Swing		

General election February 1974: Dover and Deal
Party	Candidate	Votes	%	±%
Conservative	Peter Rees	27,033	43.11	
Labour	L. J. A. Bishop	22,183	35.37	
Liberal	R. S. Young	12,832	20.46	
Ind. Social Democrat	W. Stone	661	1.05	N/A
Majority		4,850	7.74	
Turnout		62,709	84.69	
Conservative hold		Swing		

General election 1970: Dover
Party	Candidate	Votes	%	±%
Conservative	Peter Rees	30,103	51.41	
Labour	David Ennals	28,454	48.59	
Majority		1,649	2.82	N/A
Turnout		58,557	80.58	
Conservative gain from Labour		Swing		

=== Elections in the 1960s ===
General election 1966: Dover
Party	Candidate	Votes	%	±%
Labour	David Ennals	27,256	49.31	
Conservative	Tom Stacey	24,040	43.49	
Liberal	Bernard Budd	3,981	7.20	
Majority		3,216	5.82	
Turnout		55,277	84.18	
Labour hold		Swing		

General election 1964: Dover
Party	Candidate	Votes	%	±%
Labour	David Ennals	24,115	44.94	
Conservative	John Arbuthnot	23,697	44.17	
Liberal	Bernard Budd	5,843	10.89	N/A
Majority		418	0.77	N/A
Turnout		53,655	82.70	
Labour gain from Conservative		Swing		

=== Elections in the 1950s ===
General election 1959: Dover
Party	Candidate	Votes	%	±%
Conservative	John Arbuthnot	27,939	53.08	
Labour	Horace W. Lee	24,698	46.92	
Majority		3,241	6.16	
Turnout		52,637	82.88	
Conservative hold		Swing		

General election 1955: Dover
Party	Candidate	Votes	%	±%
Conservative	John Arbuthnot	27,316	52.92	
Labour	Horace W. Lee	24,298	47.08	
Majority		3,018	5.84	
Turnout		51,614	81.84	
Conservative hold		Swing		

General election 1951: Dover
Party	Candidate	Votes	%	±%
Conservative	John Arbuthnot	28,511	53.29	
Labour Co-op	Will Owen	24,995	46.71	
Majority		3,516	6.58	
Turnout		53,506	85.74	
Conservative hold		Swing		

General election 1950: Dover
Party	Candidate	Votes	%	±%
Conservative	John Arbuthnot	25,640	49.01	
Labour Co-op	Will Owen	23,331	44.59	
Liberal	Basil Goldstone	2,873	5.49	N/A
Communist	R. Morrison	474	0.91	N/A
Majority		2,309	4.42	N/A
Turnout		52,318	85.77	
Conservative gain from Labour		Swing		

=== Elections in the 1940s ===
General election 1945: Dover
Party	Candidate	Votes	%	±%
Labour	John Thomas	17,373	52.54	
Conservative	John Arbuthnot	15,691	47.46	
Majority		1,682	5.08	N/A
Turnout		33,064	73.29	
Labour gain from Conservative		Swing		

=== Elections in the 1930s ===
General election 1935: Dover
Party	Candidate	Votes	%	±%
Conservative	John Jacob Astor	25,884	63.96	
Labour	W. H. Bennett	14,588	36.04	
Majority		11,296	27.92	
Turnout		40,472	69.56	
Conservative hold		Swing		

General election 1931: Dover
Party	Candidate	Votes	%	±%
Conservative	John Jacob Astor	29,743	75.25	
Labour	W. Moore	9,781	24.75	
Liberal	Herbert Baxter	Withdrawn	N/A	N/A
Majority		19,962	50.50	
Turnout		39,524	73.05	
Conservative hold		Swing		

- withdrew on 16 October

=== Elections in the 1920s ===
General election 1929: Dover
Party	Candidate	Votes	%	±%
Unionist	John Jacob Astor	20,572	54.7	−18.8
Labour	Ernest Lionel McKeag	8,864	23.6	−2.9
Liberal	Herbert Baxter	8,180	21.7	N/A
Majority		11,708	31.1	−15.9
Turnout		37,616	74.4	−0.3
Registered electors		50,586		
Unionist hold		Swing	−8.0	

General election 1924: Dover
Party	Candidate	Votes	%	±%
Unionist	John Jacob Astor	21,186	73.5	N/A
Labour	A. F. George	7,627	26.5	N/A
Majority		13,559	47.0	N/A
Turnout		28,813	74.7	N/A
Registered electors		38,580		
Unionist hold		Swing	N/A	

By-election 1924: Dover
Party	Candidate	Votes	%	±%
Unionist	John Jacob Astor	Unopposed		
Unionist hold				

General election 1923: Dover
Party	Candidate	Votes	%	±%
Unionist	John Jacob Astor	Unopposed		
Unionist hold				

General election 1922: Dover
Party	Candidate	Votes	%	±%
Unionist	John Jacob Astor	18,151	62.2	−6.5
Anti-Waste League (Ind. Parliamentary Group)	Thomas Polson	8,054	27.6	N/A
Liberal	Leonard Stein	2,985	10.2	−21.1
Majority		10,097	34.6	−0.8
Turnout		29,190	77.6	+31.1
Registered electors		37,610		
Unionist hold		Swing	+7.3	

By-election 1921: Dover
Party		Candidate	Votes	%	±%
	Independent	Thomas Polson	13,947	56.3	N/A
C	Unionist	John Jacob Astor	10,817	43.7	−25.0
Majority			3,130	12.6	N/A
Turnout			24,764	71.0	+24.5
Registered electors			34,890		
	Independent gain from Unionist		Swing		
C indicates candidate endorsed by the coalition government.

=== Elections in the 1910s ===
General election 1918: Dover
Party		Candidate	Votes	%
C	Unionist	Vere Ponsonby	11,249	68.7
	Liberal	Alexander Livingstone	5,121	31.3
Majority			6,128	37.4
Turnout			16,370	46.5
Registered electors			35,170	
	Unionist win (new boundaries)			
C indicates candidate endorsed by the coalition government.

== Election results 1885–1918 ==
=== Elections in the 1910s ===
By-election 1913: Dover
Party	Candidate	Votes	%	±%
Unionist	Vere Ponsonby	Unopposed		
Unionist hold				

General election December 1910: Dover
Party	Candidate	Votes	%	±%
Conservative	George Wyndham	Unopposed		
Conservative hold				

General election January 1910: Dover
Party	Candidate	Votes	%	±%
Conservative	George Wyndham	3,330	67.9	+2.2
Liberal	A. M. Bradley	1,572	32.1	−2.2
Majority		1,758	35.8	+4.4
Turnout		4,902	78.5	+3.1
Registered electors		6,247		
Conservative hold		Swing	+2.2	

=== Elections in the 1900s ===
General election 1906: Dover
Party	Candidate	Votes	%	±%
Conservative	George Wyndham	3,269	65.7	N/A
Liberal	R. J. Bryce	1,705	34.3	N/A
Majority		1,564	31.4	N/A
Turnout		4,974	75.4	N/A
Registered electors		6,493		
Conservative hold		Swing	N/A	

By-election 1900: Dover
Party	Candidate	Votes	%	±%
Conservative	George Wyndham	Unopposed		
Conservative hold				

General election 1900: Dover
Party	Candidate	Votes	%	±%
Conservative	George Wyndham	Unopposed		
Conservative hold				

=== Elections in the 1890s ===
General election 1895: Dover
Party	Candidate	Votes	%	±%
Conservative	George Wyndham	Unopposed		
Conservative hold				

General election 1892: Dover
Party	Candidate	Votes	%	±%
Conservative	George Wyndham	2,231	69.5	N/A
Lib-Lab	Eustace G Edwards	978	30.5	N/A
Majority		1,253	39.0	N/A
Turnout		3,209	62.6	N/A
Registered electors		5,156		
Conservative hold				

=== Elections in the 1880s ===
General election 1886: Dover
Party	Candidate	Votes	%	±%
Conservative	Alexander George Dickson	Unopposed		
Conservative hold				

By-election 1889: Dover
Party	Candidate	Votes	%	±%
Conservative	George Wyndham	Unopposed		
Conservative hold				

General election 1885: Dover
Party	Candidate	Votes	%	±%
Conservative	Alexander George Dickson	2,066	59.3	+6.8
Liberal	Robert Murray Lawes	1,418	40.7	−6.8
Majority		648	18.6	+17.1
Turnout		3,484	71.3	−5.9
Registered electors		4,885		
Conservative hold		Swing	+6.8	

== Election results 1832–1885 ==
=== Elections in the 1880s ===
General election 1880: Dover
Party	Candidate	Votes	%	±%
Conservative	Charles Freshfield	1,734	26.5	−4.8
Conservative	Alexander George Dickson	1,701	26.0	+0.2
Liberal	Philip Stanhope	1,607	24.5	+2.5
Liberal	Charles Clement Walker	1,506	23.0	+2.1
Majority		94	1.5	−2.3
Turnout		3,274 (est)	77.2 (est)	+8.7
Registered electors		4,239		
Conservative hold		Swing	−3.7	
Conservative hold		Swing	−1.0	

=== Elections in the 1870s ===
General election 1874: Dover
Party	Candidate	Votes	%	±%
Conservative	Charles Freshfield	1,595	31.3	−0.8
Conservative	Alexander George Dickson	1,316	25.8	−8.0
Liberal	Christopher Weguelin	1,118	22.0	−11.2
Liberal	Frederick Inderwick	1,062	20.9	+20.1
Majority		198	3.8	+3.2
Turnout		2,546 (est)	68.5 (est)	−15.8
Registered electors		3,714		
Conservative gain from Liberal		Swing	+5.2	
Conservative hold		Swing	−14.1	

By-election 1873: Dover
Party	Candidate	Votes	%	±%
Conservative	Edward William Barnett	1,415	56.5	−9.4
Liberal	James Staats Forbes	1,089	43.5	+9.5
Majority		326	13.0	N/A
Turnout		2,504	70.3	−14.0
Registered electors		3,563		
Conservative gain from Liberal		Swing	−9.5	

By-election 1871: Dover
Party	Candidate	Votes	%	±%
Liberal	George Jessel	1,235	51.9	+17.9
Conservative	Edward William Barnett	1,144	48.1	−17.8
Majority		91	3.8	+2.7
Turnout		2,379	69.1	−15.2
Registered electors		3,443		
Liberal hold		Swing	+17.9	

=== Elections in the 1860s ===
General election 1868: Dover
Party	Candidate	Votes	%	±%
Conservative	Alexander George Dickson	1,461	33.8	+7.0
Liberal	George Jessel	1,435	33.2	+9.6
Conservative	Charles Freshfield	1,387	32.1	+5.7
Liberal	Israel Abrahams	35	0.8	−22.5
Turnout		2,859 (est)	84.3 (est)	+1.6
Registered electors		3,392		
Majority		26	0.6	−2.2
Conservative hold		Swing	+14.8	
Majority		48	1.1	N/A
Liberal gain from Conservative		Swing	+2.0	

General election 1865: Dover
Party	Candidate	Votes	%	±%
Conservative	Alexander George Dickson	1,026	26.8	−0.8
Conservative	Charles Freshfield	1,012	26.4	−0.3
Liberal	William Keppel	903	23.6	+0.2
Liberal	Thomas Eustace Smith	892	23.3	+1.0
Majority		109	2.8	−0.5
Turnout		1,917 (est)	82.7 (est)	−0.1
Registered electors		2,318		
Conservative hold		Swing	−0.7	
Conservative hold		Swing	−0.5	

=== Elections in the 1850s ===
General election 1859: Dover
Party	Candidate	Votes	%	±%
Conservative	Henry John Leeke	931	27.6	+6.0
Conservative	William Nicol	902	26.7	+8.9
Liberal	William Russell	788	23.4	−6.4
Liberal	Ralph Bernal Osborne	752	22.3	−8.5
Majority		114	3.3	N/A
Turnout		1,687 (est)	82.8 (est)	+3.4
Registered electors		2,038		
Conservative gain from Liberal		Swing	+6.7	
Conservative gain from Liberal		Swing	+8.2	

General election 1857: Dover
Party	Candidate	Votes	%	±%
Radical	Ralph Bernal Osborne	989	30.8	N/A
Whig	William Russell	958	29.8	−2.5
Conservative	George Clerk	695	21.6	−6.5
Conservative	George William Hope	574	17.8	−21.7
Turnout		1,608 (est)	79.4 (est)	−9.6
Registered electors		2,024		
Majority		415	13.0	N/A
Radical gain from Conservative		Swing	N/A	
Majority		263	8.2	+4.0
Whig hold		Swing	+3.8	

General election 1852: Dover
Party	Candidate	Votes	%	±%
Conservative	Henry Cadogan	1,097	39.5	+8.9
Whig	Edward Royd Rice	898	32.3	−5.3
Conservative	George Clerk	781	28.1	−3.7
Turnout		1,837 (est)	89.0 (est)	+17.8
Registered electors		2,064		
Majority		199	7.2	
Conservative hold		Swing	+5.8	
Majority		117	4.2	−1.6
Whig hold		Swing	−5.3	

=== Elections in the 1840s ===
General election 1847: Dover
Party	Candidate	Votes	%	±%
Whig	Edward Royd Rice	1,104	37.6	+3.0
Conservative	George Clerk	932	31.8	−4.2
Conservative	Henry Thoby Prinsep	897	30.6	+11.3
Majority		172	5.8	−9.5
Turnout		1,467 (est)	71.2 (est)	−18.6
Registered electors		2,060		
Whig hold		Swing	−2.1	
Conservative hold		Swing	−2.9	

General election 1841: Dover
Party	Candidate	Votes	%	±%
Conservative	John Reid	1,000	36.0	+1.8
Whig	Edward Royd Rice	960	34.6	−0.6
Conservative	John Halcomb	536	19.3	−11.3
Radical	Alexander Galloway	281	10.1	N/A
Turnout		1,667	89.8	−0.4
Registered electors		2,060		
Majority		40	1.4	
Conservative hold		Swing	+1.1	
Majority		424	15.3	+14.3
Whig hold		Swing	+2.1	

=== Elections in the 1830s ===
General election 1837: Dover
Party	Candidate	Votes	%	±%
Whig	Edward Royd Rice	854	35.2	+4.2
Conservative	John Reid	829	34.2	+2.3
Conservative	John Minet Fector	742	30.6	−6.4
Majority		25	1.0	N/A
Turnout		1,512	90.2	+4.1
Registered electors		1,677		
Whig gain from Conservative		Swing	+3.1	
Conservative hold		Swing	+0.1	

General election 1835: Dover
Party	Candidate	Votes	%	±%
Conservative	John Minet Fector	908	37.0	+15.0
Conservative	John Reid	782	31.9	+4.8
Whig	Edward Royd Rice	761	31.0	−19.9
Majority		21	0.9	−5.3
Turnout		1,347	86.1	+1.5
Registered electors		1,564		
Conservative hold		Swing	+12.5	
Conservative gain from Whig		Swing	+7.4	

By-election 1833: Dover
Party	Candidate	Votes	%	±%
Tory	John Halcomb	734	52.5	+3.4
Whig	Robert Henry Stanhope	665	47.5	−3.4
Majority		69	5.0	N/A
Turnout		1,399	84.7	+0.1
Registered electors		1,651		
Conservative gain from Whig		Swing	+3.4	

General election 1832: Dover
Party	Candidate	Votes	%
Whig	Charles Poulett Thomson	713	30.0
Tory	John Reid	644	27.1
Tory	John Halcomb	523	22.0
Whig	Robert Henry Stanhope	498	20.9
Turnout		1,396	84.6
Registered electors		1,651	
Majority		69	2.9
Whig hold			
Majority		146	6.2
Tory gain from Whig			

== Elections before 1832 ==
=== Elections in the 1830s ===
General election 1831: Dover
Party	Candidate	Votes	%
Whig	Charles Poulett Thomson	Unopposed	
Whig	Robert Henry Stanhope	Unopposed	
Registered electors		c. 2,000	
Whig hold			
Whig gain from Tory			

By-election November 1830: Dover
Party	Candidate	Votes	%
Whig	Charles Poulett Thomson	Unopposed	
Registered electors		c. 2,000	
Whig hold			

General election 1830: Dover
Party	Candidate	Votes	%	±%
Whig	Charles Poulett Thomson	975	36.2	
Tory	John Reid	974	36.1	
Tory	John Halcomb	748	27.7	
Majority		1	0.1	
Turnout		1,866	c. 93.3	
Registered electors		c. 2,000		
Whig hold		Swing		
Tory hold		Swing		

== See also ==
- List of parliamentary constituencies in Kent
- List of parliamentary constituencies in the South East England (region)

== Sources ==
- Robert Beatson, A Chronological Register of Both Houses of Parliament (London: Longman, Hurst, Res & Orme, 1807)
- The Constitutional Year Book for 1913 (London: National Union of Conservative and Unionist Associations, 1913)
- F. W. S. Craig, British Parliamentary Election Results 1832–1885 (2nd edition, Aldershot: Parliamentary Research Services, 1989)
- F. W. S. Craig, British Parliamentary Election Results 1918–1949 (Glasgow: Political Reference Publications, 1969)
