= Edmund Mody =

16th-century English politician

Captain Edmund Mody (also spelled Moody, Moodye, and Mondye) MP (1495–28 May 1552) was an English Member of Parliament for Dover.

He is not the same person as the royal footman Edmund Moody, who was granted a coat-of-arms and the status of gentleman for saving the life of Henry VIII during a hunt, and who was the ancestor of the Moody baronets.

== Biography ==
=== Captain and Bailiff of Dover Castle ===
Mody was appointed Captain of the then newly constructed Black Bulwark at Dover in September 1534. In July 1537, Mody was granted the Baliffship of Dover, to which he succeeded in 1543, subsequent to the death of Thomas Vaughan. In 1543, he was made a freeman of Dover and bought property in the town’s Snargare and Werston wards. He was a member of the Brotherhood of the Cinque Ports.

Mody is mentioned in the inventory of Henry VIII’s assets on his death, which is now held in the British Library as Harley Manuscript no. 1419, which states him to be the occupant of a bulwark of Dover Castle that was adjacent to Dover Cliff.

=== Member of Parliament for Dover ===
In 1545, Mody became Member of Parliament (MP) for Dover. In 1546, he was granted another annuity of £20. In 1547, he attended the Coronation of Edward VI.

=== Marriage and Death ===
Mody married a woman named Margery by whom he had at least one son, who was named Christopher.

Mody died on 28 May 1552. In his will, he requested that he be buried in St. Mary's, Dover, 'in a chancel where the alderman do sit', and stipulated that a bequest were to be left to the officers of Dover Castle. His ship, named the Christopher, passed, with his goods and leases, to his wife. He was succeeded as Bailiff of Dover by his deputy Thomas Portway.
