= Thomas Smith (MP for Dover) =

Member of the Parliament of England in the 1470–71 Parliament

Thomas Smith (1440-1483) was Member of Parliament for Dover in the Readeption Parliament of 1470-71.

Smith was a yeoman, a man of middling social rank; his father was likely Stephen Smith of Tenterden, a port town in western Kent. Smith had previously served as the chamberlain of Dover in 1467-68, and then bailiff in 1470 following Henry VI's return to power. When the Lancastrian parliament was summoned in October 1470, Smith was named one of the burgesses for the town.

He served until the end of the Parliament in April 1471. In July 1471, he was given a general pardon along with other members of the Parliament.
