= David Shaw (British politician) =

British former Member of Parliament (1950–2022)

Member of Parliament for Dover
- In office 11 June 1987 – 8 April 1997
- Preceded by: Peter Rees
- Succeeded by: Gwyn Prosser

Personal details
- Born: 14 November 1950
- Died: 23 August 2022 (aged 71)
- Party: Conservative
- Children: 2
- Education: City of London Polytechnic

David Lawrence Shaw (14 November 1950 – 23 August 2022) was a British politician who served as a Member of Parliament (MP). He was the Conservative Member for Dover from the 1987 general election until the 1997 election, when he lost the seat to Gwyn Prosser of Labour. He was one of the first British Members of Parliament to use the Internet to communicate.

== Early life ==
Shaw was born on 14 November 1950. He was educated at the King's College School, Wimbledon and the City of London Polytechnic.

== Political career ==
Shaw contested the Leigh, Greater Manchester, constituency at the 1979 general election, but was not elected.

Shaw was embroiled in the Pamella Bordes scandal after providing her with a House of Commons security pass. Bordes was "his part-time unpaid researcher" from the end of December 1988 until 21 February 1989, working on the Net Book Agreement.

In January 1998 the then Prime Minister Tony Blair described Shaw who had lost his seat nine months before as being "[both] nasty and ineffectual in equal quantities."

At the 2001 general election he stood in the London constituency of Kingston and Surbiton against the Liberal Democrat MP Ed Davey, who was defending a majority of just 56 from the election four years earlier. In the event, Davey held the seat with a majority increased by over 15,000.

=== Political positions ===
- Chairman, Bow Group, 1983–84
- Founder, Transatlantic Conference, 1982
- Member, Social Security Select Committee, 1991–97
- Joint Chairman, All Party Committee on Dolphins, 1989–97
- Chairman, Conservative Backbench Smaller Businesses Committee, 1990–97 (Secretary, 1987–90)
- Vice Chairman, Conservative Backbench Finance Committee, 1991–97 (Hon. Secretary, 1990–91)
- Vice-Chairman, Kingston and Malden Conservative Association, 1979–86

== Professional career ==
Shaw was a chartered accountant and the founder, Chairman and Director, Sabrelance Ltd, corporate finance advisers, from 1983.

=== Positions held ===
- FCA 1974
- Coopers & Lybrand, 1971–79
- County Bank, 1979–83
- Chairman: RRI PLC, 1994–2000
- 2020 Strategy Ltd, 1997–
- Deputy Chairman, The Adscene Group PLC, 1986–99
- Director, Nettec plc, 2003–05
- Member, Political, Communications and Marketing Committee
- Quoted Cos Alliance (formerly City Group for Smaller Quoted Companies), 1997–
- Member, Royal Borough of Kingston upon Thames Council, 1974–78
- Member, Board of Senior Advisors, Center for Global Economic Growth, Washington DC, 2005–
- Founder and Director, David Shaw Charitable Trust, 1994–
- Vice-President, Institute of Patentees and Inventors, 1996–

== Personal life and death ==
Shaw married Dr Lesley Brown in 1986. They had one son, born in September 1989 and one daughter, Annabel who addressed the Conservative Party Conference in 2009 at just 15 years of age. He died after a long illness on 23 August 2022, at the age of 71.

Parliament of the United Kingdom
Preceded by Peter Rees	Member of Parliament for Dover; 1987–1997	Succeeded by Gwyn Prosser
