= Nicholas Templeman =

16th-century English politician

Nicholas Templeman (by 1478 – between 1515 and 1520), of Dover, Kent, was an English politician.

Templeman was a member of parliament (MP) for Dover in 1512 and 1515.
