= John Moore (MP for Dover) =

English politician

John Moore II of Dover, Kent, was an English politician.

He was a Member of Parliament (MP) for Dover in 1584 and 1586.
