= John Enebrook =

Member of the Parliament of England

John Enebrook (died 1415) was the member of Parliament for the constituency of Dover for the parliament of 1399.
