= Walter Stratton =

English Member of Parliament

Walter Stratton (died c. 1444) was the member of Parliament for the constituency of Dover for multiple parliaments from November 1414 to 1427.
