= Braben =

Braben is a surname. Notable people with the surname include:

- David Braben (born 1964), British video game developer and designer
- Donald Braben (1935–2025), English science writer
- Eddie Braben (1930–2013), British comedy writer and performer

== See also ==
- Raben
