= Edward Stevens =

Edward or Ed Stevens may refer to:

- Edward Stevens (general) (1745–1820), American general in the revolutionary war
- Lumpy Stevens (Edward Stevens, 1735–1819), English cricketer
- Eddie Stevens (Edmund Stevens), musician
- Ed Stevens (baseball) (1925–2012), first baseman in Major League Baseball
- Edward Stevens (rower) (1932–2013), American rower
- Edward Cephas John Stevens (1837–1915), New Zealand politician
- Edward F. Stevens, (1860-1946), American architect and author
- Ed Stevens, a character from the television series Ed
- Edward Stevens (diplomat) (c. 1755-1834), American diplomat and physician

== See also ==
- Edward Stephens (disambiguation)
