= Richard Barrey =

16th-century English politician

Richard Barrey (died 1588), of the Moat, Sevington and Dover, Kent was an English politician.

He was a member of parliament (MP) for Dover in 1584 and 1586 and for Winchelsea in 1572.
