= Thomas Elwood (MP) =

English politician

Thomas Elwood (died 1612), of Dover, Kent, was an English politician.

He was a Member of Parliament (MP) for Dover in 1593.
