= 1921 Dover by-election =

UK parliamentary by-election

← 1918	12 January 1921	1922 →

Candidate	Polson	Astor
Party	Independent	Unionist
Popular vote	13,947	10,817
Percentage	56.3%	43.7%
MP before election
Ponsonby
Unionist
Subsequent MP
Astor
Unionist

The 1921 Dover by-election was held on 12 January 1921. The by-election was held due to the succession to the peerage of the incumbent Coalition Unionist MP, Vere Ponsonby as Ninth Earl of Bessborough. It was won by the Independent candidate Thomas Andrew Polson.

Polson's election was supported by Horatio Bottomley, but although claimed by Bottonmley as a member of the right-wing Independent Parliamentary Group, he joined the Anti-Waste League shortly after his election. Polson stood again at the general election in November 1922, but was defeated by the Unionist candidate John Jacob Astor, whom he had defeated at the by-election in 1921.

== Result ==
Dover by-election, 1921
Party		Candidate	Votes	%	±%
	Independent	Thomas Andrew Polson	13,947	56.3	New
C	Unionist	John Jacob Astor	10,817	43.7	−25.0
Majority			3,130	12.6	N/A
Turnout			24,764	71.0	+24.5
	Independent gain from Unionist		Swing		
C indicates candidate endorsed by the coalition government.
