= Thomas Fane (died 1607) =

English politician

Thomas Fane (died 1607), of Burston, Hunton, Kent, was an English politician.

He was a Member of Parliament for Dover, Kent, in 1589, 1593 and 1597. He was the younger brother of Thomas Fane (died 1589), Sheriff of Kent and ancestor of the Earl of Westmorland.
