= Raben =

Raben is a surname. Notable people with the name include:

- Cathrine Raben Davidsen (born 1972), Danish artist
- Frederik Christian Raben (1769–1838), Danish count, traveller and amateur naturalist
- Frederik Raben-Levetzau (1850–1933), Danish count and politician
- Peer Raben (1940–2007), German composer
- Robert Raben (born 1963), American attorney
- Sam Raben (born 1997), American soccer player

== See also ==
- Raben Group, Dutch logistics company
- Rabén & Sjögren, Swedish publishing company
- Raben Steinfeld, municipality in Mecklenburg-Vorpommern, Germany
