= List of mayors of Dover =

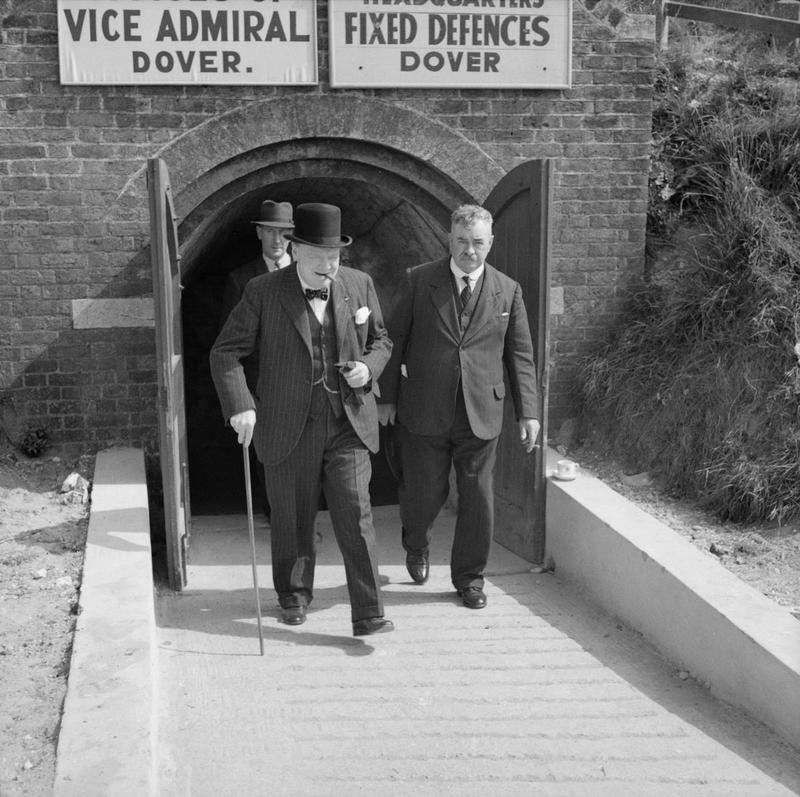
Winston Churchill and the Mayor of Dover in August 1940

Mayors of the town of Dover, Kent, England.

== 13th century ==
- 1258: James Lucas
- 1295: Thomas Edward Poynte
- 1299: John de Mari

== 14th century ==
- 1329: William Hurtyn
- 1342: John Monyn
- 1356: Peter Reade
- 1357–1358: Richard atte Halle
- 1359: Peter Beade
- 1360–1364: ?
- 1365: William de Denne
- 1366–1367: Nicholas atte Hall
- 1368–1339: Thomas Spisor
- 1370: Simon Monyn
- September 1371 – 1372: John Halle
- 1373–1374: John Halle
- 1375–1376: John Moony
- 1376–1378: John Gerold
- 1378–1380: John Strete
- 1380–1382: John Halle
- 1382–1384: John Gyles
- 1388–1389: John Halle
- 1389–1391: John Gyles
- 1391–1392: John Halle
- 1392–1393: John Gyles
- 1393–1394: John Halle
- 1399–1400: John Gyles

== 15th century ==
- 1401–1402: John Gyles
- 1402–1403: Peter Rede
- 1403–1404: John Monyn
- 1404–1406: John Strete
- 1406–1408: Thomas Gyles
- 1408–1411: John Strete
- 1411–1412: John Enebroke and John Luestroke
- 1413–1414: Thomas Gyles
- 1414–1415: Thomas Gyles and Walter Stratton
- 1415–1417: John Garton
- 1417–1419: Walter Stratton
- 1419–1421: Thomas atte Crowche
- 1421–1422: Walter Stratton
- 1422–1423: Thomas Arnold
- 1423–1424: Walter Stratton
- 1424–1425: Thomas Arnold
- 1425–1426: John Braban
- 1426–1427: Walter Stratton
- 1427–1428: John Braban
- 1428–1429: Walter Stratton
- 1429–1430: William Brewys
- 1430–1431: Thomas Arnold
- 1431–1433: Walter Stratton
- 1433–1435: John Braban
- 1435–1436: John Braban and William Brewys
- 1436–1440: William Brewys
- 1439–1440: Walter Stratton
- 1440–1441: William Brewys
- 1441–1443: John Warde
- 1443–1444: William Brewys
- 1444–1445: Ralph Toke
- 1445–1449: Ralph Toke and Thomas Gore
- 1449–1450: Thomas Gore
- 1450–1451: Thomas Gore and Richard Grigge
- 1451–1453: Richard Grigge
- 1453–1456: Thomas Doyley
- 1456–1458: Thomas Gore
- 1458–1460: Nicholas Burton
- 1460–1461: Richard Palmer
- 1461–1462: Thomas Gore and Richard Palmer
- 1462–1463: Thomas Gore
- 1463–1464: Richard Palmer
- 1464–1465: Thomas Pety
- 1465–1466: Thomas Gore
- 1466–1467: Thomas Gore and Richard Palmer
- 1467–1468: Richard Palmer
- 1468–1470: Thomas Hexstall
- 1470–1471: Thomas Hexstall and Thomas Toke
- 1471–1472: Richard Palmer and Thomas Hexstall
- 1472–1474: Thomas Hexstall and Thomas Toke
- 1474–1475: Thomas Hexstall
- 1475–1476: Richard Pleysington
- 1476–1477: Robert Vyncent
- 1477–1478: Thomas Hexstall and Robert Vyncent
- 1478–1479: Thomas Toke and Thomas Hexstall
- 1479–1480: Richard Palmer
- 1480–1481: Thomas Fouche
- 1481–1482: Thomas Hexstall and Thomas Fouche
- 1482–1485: John Byngham
- 1485–1486: Robert Vyncent
- 1486–1487: John Templeman
- 1487–1488: John Byngham
- 1488–1489: Robert Vyncent
- 1489–1490: Robert Vyncent
- 1490–1491: Edward Hexstall
- 1491–1492: Robert Vyncent
- 1492–1493: Henry Balgy
- 1493–1494: William Warren
- 1494–1496: Edward Hexstall
- 1496–1497: Richard Fyneaux
- 1497–1499: John Byngham
- 1499–1501: William Stone

== 16th century ==
- 1501–1502: John Pocock
- 1502–1504: Richard Fyneaux
- 1504–1505: Oliver Lythgo
- 1505–1506: Robert Nethersole
- 1506–1507: Edward Hexstall
- 1507–1508: Richard Fyneaux
- 1508–1509: Robert Nethersole
- 1509–1510: Richard Monin
- 1510–1511: Nicholas Templeman
- 1511–1512: John Broke
- 1512–1513: Robert Nethersole
- 1513–1514: Nicholas Aldy
- 1514–1515: Richard Fyneaux
- 1515–1516: Thomas Vaughan
- 1516–1517: Nicholas Aldy and John Gregorie
- 1517–1518: Nicholas Aldy
- 1518–1519: Robert Weltden
- 1519–1520: Thomas Vaughan
- 1520–1521: John Elam
- 1521–1522: John Elam and Robert Stelman
- 1522–1523: Robert Stelman
- 1523–1524: Robert Dyer
- 1524–1525: John Broke
- 1525–1526: John Warren
- 1526–1527: Richard Crouch
- 1527–1528: Thomas Vaughan
- 1528–1529: Robert Fluce and Rouse Buskins
- 1529–1530: Robert Fluce
- 1530–1532: Robert Nethersole
- 1532–1533: Thomas Vaughan and Thomas Foxley
- 1533–1535: Edward May
- 1535–1536: John Payntor
- 1536–1537: John Warren
- 1537–1538: Ralph Buffkin
- 1538–1539: Edward May
- 1539–1540: John Bowles
- 1540–1541: John Warren and John Bowles
- 1541–1542: Thomas Foxley
- 1542–1543: Thomas Foxley and Robert Justice
- 1543–1544: John Elam
- 1544–1545: William Fisher
- 1545–1546: Thomas Colly
- 1546–1547: Richard Fyneaux and Thomas Colly
- 1547–1548: Richard Fyneaux, Hugo Brackett and Thomas Mauncell
- 1548–1549: Hugo Brackett and Thomas Warren
- 1549–1550: Thomas Mauncell and Thomas Warren
- 1550–1551: Thomas Portway, MP of Dover, 1553
- 1551–1552: Robert Justice, Thomas Portway and Robert Justin
- 1552–1554: Thomas Fynnett
- 1554–1555: Richard Elam and William Hannington
- 1555–1556: Adrian Whitt and Richard Elary
- 1556–1557: Adrian Whitt
- 1557–1558: Thomas Warren
- 1558–1559: Thomas Colly
- 1559–1560: Thomas Pepper
- 1560–1561: Richard Gibbs
- 1561–1562: William Hannington
- 1562–1563: John Robins
- 1563–1564: Thomas Pepper and John Robins
- 1564–1565: William Burden
- 1565–1566: Thomas Pepper
- 1566–1567: Thomas Watson
- 1567–1568: Thomas Pepper
- 1568–1569: John Edwards
- 1569–1570: Richard Elam
- 1570–1571: Thomas Burnell
- 1571–1574: Thomas Andrews
- 1574–1575: Thomas Andrews and Thomas Warren
- 1575–1576: John Robins
- 1576–1577: John Lucas
- 1577–1579: Robert Fynnett
- 1579–1580: Thomas Allyn
- 1580–1582: John Garrett
- 1582–1583: Thomas Andrews and Thomas Warren
- 1583–1584: Thomas Andrews and William Willis
- 1584–1585: Thomas Watson
- 1585–1586: William Willis
- 1586–1588: Thomas Brodgatte
- 1588–1589: John Tench
- 1589–1590: Henry Leonard
- 1590–1591: Jeffery Glydd
- 1591–1592: Humphrey Meade
- 1592–1593: Thomas Elwood
- 1593–1594: Robert Burnett
- 1594–1595: John Skaythe
- 1595–1597: George Bynge
- 1597–1598: William Leonard
- 1598–1599: Jeremy Garrett
- 1599–1600: Edward Kempe

== 17th century ==
- 1600–1601: John Bachelor
- 1601–1602: John Bradgate
- 1602–1603: Richard Siseley
- 1603–1604: William Nethersole
- 1604–1606: George Bynge
- 1606–1607: John Tooke
- 1607–1608: Henry Steede
- 1608–1609: Robert Garrett
- 1609–1610: Robert Austin
- 1610–1612: William Leonard
- 1612–1613: Edward Kempe (died whilst in office) and William Warde
- 1613–1614: William Warde
- 1614–1615: Robert Garrett
- 1615–1616: John Waade
- 1616–1617: Thomas Foord
- 1617–1618: Nicholas Eaton
- 1618–1620: William Ward
- 1621: Robert Garrett
- 1622: Henry Steed
- 1623–1624: John Waad
- 1625: Thomas Foord

== 19th century ==
- 1800: Thomas Bateman Lane
- 1801: George Stringer
- 1802: William Knocker
- 1803: Jonathan Osborn
- 1804: Robert Walker
- 1805: Phineas Kennett
- 1808: Robert Hunt
- 1807: William King
- 1808: Edward Thompson
- 1809: Thomas Mantell
- 1810: George Dell
- 1811: Edward Thompson
- 1812: Sir Thomas Mantell
- 1813: James Walker
- 1814: Henshaw Latham
- 1815: George Stringer
- 1816: Jonathan Osbom
- 1817: William Knocker
- 1818: Robert Walker
- 1819: Sir Thomas Mantell
- 1820: George Doll
- 1821: Heushaw Latham
- 1822: John Jeken
- 1823: Joseph Webb Pitcher
- 1824: Sir Thomas Mantell
- 1825: John Finnis
- 1826: George Stringer
- 1827: John Shipdem
- 1828: Matthew Kennett
- 1829: Henry Pringle Bruyeres
- 1830: Henshaw Latham
- 1831: John Coleman
- 1832: William Knocker
- 1833: Joseph Webb Pilcher
- 1834: William Cooke
- 1835: John Shipdem
- 1836: Edward Pett Thompson/William Cooke
- 1837–1838: Michael Elwin
- 1839: William Cocke
- 1840-1: Edward Poole
- 1842-5: William Clarke
- 1846: William Cocke
- 1863–1864: Captain Jeffery Wheelock Noble, R.N.
- 1867: Joseph George Churchward, postal merchant between France, England and Belgium
- 1872: Edward Ruttley Mowll, wine and spirits merchant
- 1873–1874: Frederick Samuel Pierce, ship owner
- 1875: Percy Simpson Court
- 1876: George Fielding
- 1877: Percy Simpson Court
- 1878: Alexander Bottle
- 1879–1880: Richard Dickeson
- 1881: John Lade Bradley
- 1882: Richard Dickeson
- 1883: Rowland Rees
- 1884: Thomas Viney Brown
- 1885: William John Adcock
- 1886–1888: William Henry Crundall

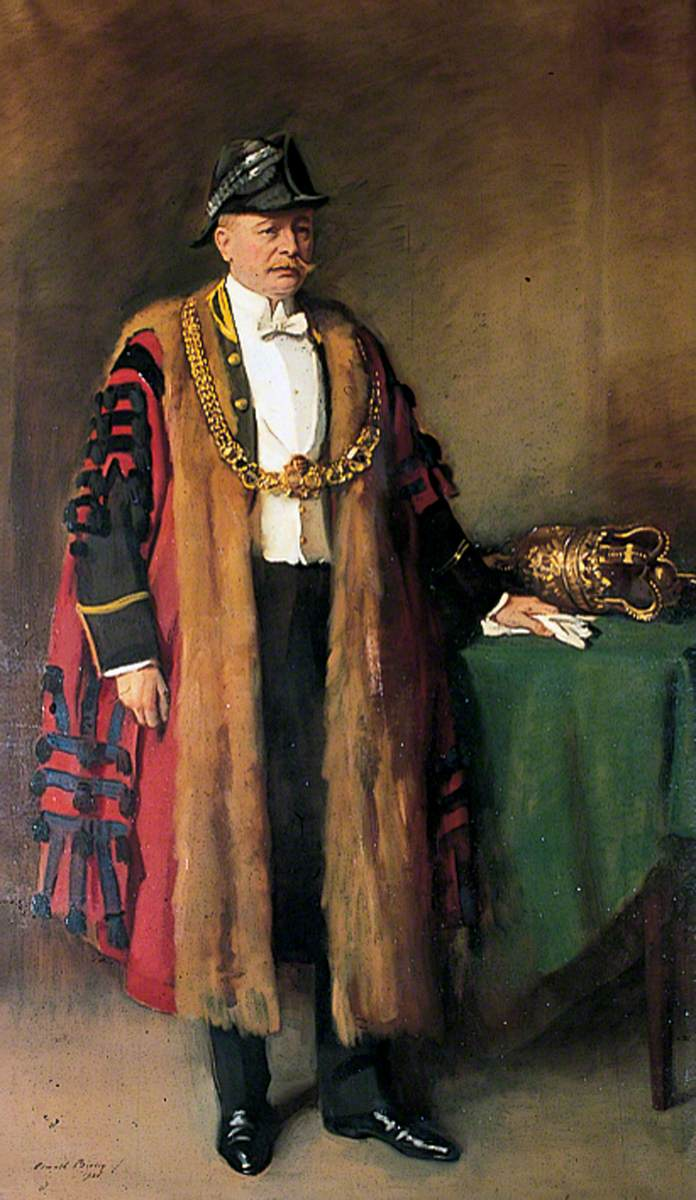
William Crundall would serve as mayor a total of thirteen times between 1886 and 1910.

- 1889: Edward Lukey
- 1890: William John Adcock
- 1891–1884: William Henry Crundall
- 1895: Matthew Pepper
- 1896: Henry Minter Baker
- 1897–1899: William Henry Crundall

== 20th century ==
- 1900–1901: Sir William Henry Crundall
- 1901–1902: Henry Martyn Mowll, solicitor
- 1902–1903: Frederick George Wright (Conservative)
- 1903–1904: Arthur Thomas Walmisley
- 1904–1905: Sir William Henry Crundall
- 1905–1906: William Wood Burkett
- 1906–1907: George Francis Raggett
- 1907–1910: Walter L Emden
- 1910–1911: Sir William Henry Crundall
- 1911–1913: William Bromley
- 1913–1919: Edwin W. T. Farley
- 1939–1945: James Robinson Cairns
- 1960–1961: Dorothy Bushell

== 21st century ==
Source: Dover Town Council

- 2000: Gordon Cowan
- 2001–2002: Diane G Smallwood
- 2003: George P Allt
- 2004: Robert R Markham
- 2005: Kenneth Tranter
- 2006: Janet F Tranter
- 2007: Robert R Markham
- 2008: Diane G Smallwood
- 2009: Sue Jones
- 2010: Sue Jones
- 2011: Veronica Philpott
- 2012: Anne Smith
- 2013: Veronica Philpott
- 2014: Pamela Brivio
- 2015: Chris Precious
- 2016–2017: Neil Rix
- 2018: Sue Jones
- 2019–2023: Gordon Cowan
- 2023–2024: Sue Jones
- 2024-2026: Edward Biggs
- 2026 Bekah Dawes
