= John Strete =

Member of Parliament

John Strete (died c. 1414) was the member of Parliament for the constituency of Dover for multiple parliaments from 1373 to 1402.

He was also the Mayor of Dover for several years; 1378, 1379, 1385, 1397, 1398, 1404, 1405, 1406, 1408, 1409 and 1410.
