= Hanington =

Hanington may refer to:

== People ==
- Daniel Lionel Hanington (1839-1905) New Brunswick politician
- Daniel Lionel Hanington (Admiral) (1921-1999) Rear-Admiral in the Canadian Navy

== See also ==
- Hannington (disambiguation)
