= Nicholas Spicer =

Member of the Parliament of England

Nicholas Spicer was the member of Parliament for the constituency of Dover for the parliament of January 1397 and 1410.
