= Gwyn Prosser =

British Labour politician (born 1943)

- Prosser in 2008

Member of Parliament for Dover
- In office 1 May 1997 – 12 April 2010
- Preceded by: David Shaw
- Succeeded by: Charlie Elphicke

Personal details
- Born: 27 April 1943 (age 83) Swansea, Wales
- Party: Labour
- Children: 3
- Education: Swansea Technical College

Gwynfor Matthews Prosser (born 27 April 1943) is a British politician and engineer who served as Member of Parliament (MP) for Dover from 1997 to 2010. A member of the Labour Party, he worked as a marine engineer and served on Dover District Council and Kent County Council prior to his election to Parliament.

== Early life and career ==
Gwynfor Matthews Prosser was born on 27 April 1943 in Swansea, Wales. He was educated at Dunvant Secondary Modern School and gained a National Diploma in Mechanical Engineering from Swansea Technical College.

Prosser began his marine engineering career in 1960, as a Merchant Navy cadet engineer, and was later employed at BP and Blue Funnel Line. He became as a senior engineer in the 1970s, working for BR Shipping, John Kincaid of Greenock, Aramco in Saudi Arabia, and Anscar. Prosser was chief engineer for Sealink Ferries in Dover from 1979 to 1992.

During his engineering career, he served on the executive of the National Union of Marine, Aviation and Shipping Transport Officers. Between the 1992 and 1997 general elections, he was a social survey interviewer for the civil service.

== Political career ==
Elected to Dover District Council in 1987 and Kent County Council in 1989, he served as a committee chair on both during his tenure in the roles.

Prosser was elected as Member of Parliament for the Dover constituency at the 1997 general election, defeating incumbent Conservative David Shaw. He had unsuccessfully contested the seat at the 1992 general election, but substantially reduced Shaw's majority to less than 900 votes.

Re-elected in 2001 and 2005, Prosser was a member of the Home Affairs Select Committee from 2001 to 2010. He was defeated by Conservative Charlie Elphicke at the 2010 general election, and subsequently retired from politics.

== Personal life ==
Prosser married his wife in 1972, with whom he had two daughters and one son.

Parliament of the United Kingdom
Preceded by David Shaw	Member of Parliament for Dover; 1997–2010	Succeeded by Charlie Elphicke
