= Pynchon (surname) =

Pynchon is an English surname. Notable people with the surname include:

== People ==
- Adeline Lobdell Pynchon (1887–1975), American author, art dealer and collector
- Edwin Pynchon (1853–1914), American otolaryngologist
- George M. Pynchon (1862–1940), American yacht racer
- Thomas Pynchon (born 1937), American novelist
- William Pynchon (1590–1662), English colonial settler and founder of Springfield, Massachusetts
- William Pynchon Stewart Ventress (1854–1911), American politician in Mississippi

== Fictional characters ==
- Margaret Pynchon, portrayed by Nancy Marchand on Lou Grant
- Stephen Pynchon, portrayed by Malcolm McDowell on Pearl

== See also ==
- Pinchon, French surname
