= Thomas Polson =

Anglo-Irish writer

Colonel Sir Thomas Andrew Polson, KBE, CMG, TD (28 August 1865 – 22 August 1946) was an Anglo-Irish writer who was briefly the Member of Parliament (MP) for Dover.

== Biography ==
Colson was born in Tuam, County Galway, Ireland, the eldest surviving son of Thomas Andrew Polson, Tuam agent for Bradford city wool buyers. He was educated at Tuam Diocesan School and from there went into business.

He was commissioned an officer in the City of London Yeomanry (Rough Riders), where he was promoted to captain on 21 July 1902, and to major on the following day.

He married Elizabeth Lindsay of Edinburgh in 1918, while Chief Inspector of the Army Clothing Department.

Polson was elected to the House of Commons at a by-election in January 1921, after the Conservative MP Viscount Duncannon had succeeded to the peerage as Earl of Bessborough. Polson's election was supported by Horatio Bottomley, but although claimed by Bottomley as a member of the right-wing Independent Parliamentary Group, he joined the Anti-Waste League shortly after his election. Polson stood again at the general election in November 1922, but was defeated by the Conservative candidate John Jacob Astor, whom he had defeated at the by-election in 1921.

He held the rank of colonel and was knighted.

== Bibliography ==
- The Life of a bold AB on his ship in the Rolling C, London, Dean & Son, 1903

== Sources ==
- Galway Authors, Helen Mahar, 1976

Parliament of the United Kingdom
Preceded by Viscount Duncannon	Member of Parliament for Dover; 1921 – 1922	Succeeded by John Jacob Astor
