= John Webbe (died 1557) =

English politician

John Webbe (by 1516 – 1556/1557) was an English politician. He was a member of parliament for Dover in October 1553, April 1554, and November 1554.
