= Thomas Arnold (educator of the deaf) =

English educator of the deaf and Nonconformist minister (1816–1897)

Thomas Arnold (1816 – 1897) was an English educator of the deaf and Nonconformist minister. He was a notable proponent of Oralism and founder of the Northampton School for the Deaf. He is the author of A Method of Teaching the Deaf and Dumb Speech, Lip-Reading, and Language, first published in 1881.
