= Thomas Gyles =

English politician

Thomas Gyles (fl. 1402–1406) of Dover, Kent, was an English politician.

== Family ==
He was the son of John Gyles, also an MP for Dover and Mayor of Dover. The name of Thomas' mother is unrecorded. At some point before February 1413, Thomas married a woman named Martha.

== Career ==
He was a member (MP) of the parliament of England for Dover in 1402 and 1406. He was mayor of Dover in 1406–1408 and 1413–14.
