= Adeline Lobdell Atwater =

American writer and art director

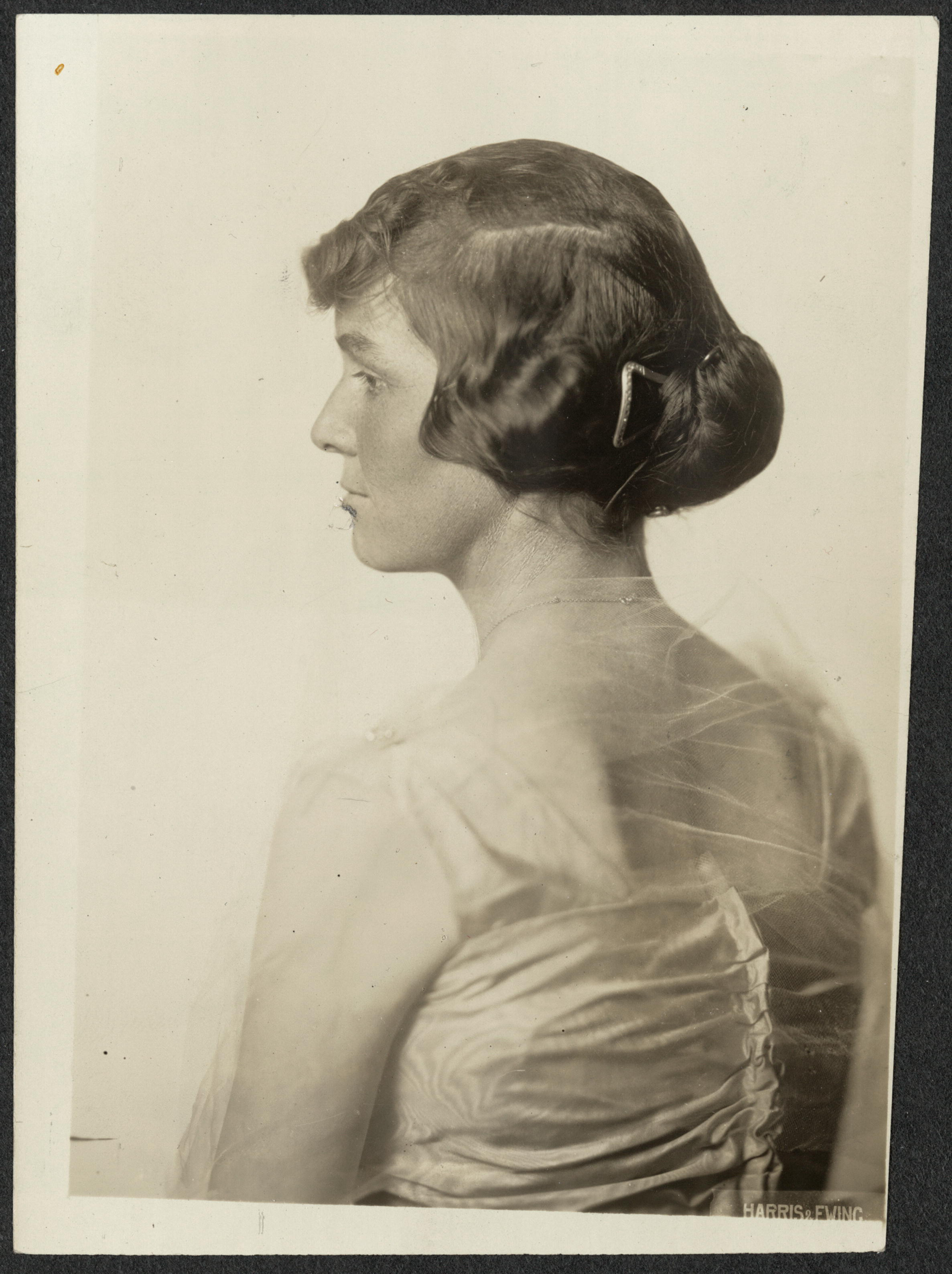
- Born: 1887; Chicago
- Died: 1975 (aged 87–88); Chicago
- Occupation: Art director, writer, suffragist

Adeline Lobdell (1887–1975) was an American author, art dealer and collector. Born in 1887 in Chicago, where she was raised, Lobdell was educated at local seminaries and briefly at the Art Institute of Chicago. She married Henry Atwater, and the couple had two daughters. The family moved to Washington, D.C., where Adeline became active in the National Woman's Party as the representative for Illinois. Following World War I, Lobdell was granted a divorce in Reno, Nevada, and moved to New York City, New York, where she became the art director of the New Gallery. She then became a writer, composing both fiction such as The Marriage of Don Quixote and nonfiction such as Autobiography of an Extrovert. In 1932, Lobdell remarried to Harold C. Pynchon. Her writing career flourished and she garnered attention for her short stories in New York Magazine, New York Herald Tribune, and The Midwest Review of Literature. She died in Chicago in 1975.
