= William Leonard (English politician) =

Member of the Parliament of England

William Leonard, of Dover, Kent, was an English politician.

He was a member of parliament (MP) for Dover in 1597.
