= Thomas Portway =

16th-century English politician

Thomas Portway (by 1524 – 1557), of Dover, Kent, was an English politician.

He was a member of parliament (MP) for Dover in March 1553. He was mayor of Dover from 1550 to 1551.
