= Thomas Andrews (MP for Dover) =

16th-century English politician

Thomas Andrews (born before 1540), of Dover, Kent, was an English politician.

He was a Member of Parliament (MP) for Dover in 1571 and 1572.
