= Henry Hannington =

English academic, cleric, and cricketer

Personal information
- Full name: Henry Hannington
- Born: 15 January 1797; Hanwell, Middlesex
- Died: 4 October 1870 (aged 73); South Kensington, London

Domestic team information
- Years: Team
- 1819–1821: Cambridge University
- Source: CricketArchive, 31 March 2013

Henry Hannington (15 January 1797 – 4 October 1870) was an English academic and cleric, who was also a cricketer.

== Life ==
The son of the Rev. John George Hannington, Rector of Hampton Bishop, Herefordshire, he was educated at Eton College, and went to King's College, Cambridge as a scholar in 1817. There he was made a Fellow in 1820, graduating B.A. in 1822; M.A. in 1825. He remained a Fellow until his death; he was bursar of King's 1824–38.

Ordained deacon in 1822 and priest in 1823, Hannington never took a living. He died on 4 October 1870, at 11 Onslow Crescent, South Kensington.

== Cricket ==
Hannington was a cricketer associated with Cambridge University Cricket Club who is recorded in two matches, totalling 117 runs with a highest score of 63, completing one stumping and taking 2 wickets. With Charles Oxenden he founded the Club in 1820.
