= Thomas Colly =

16th-century English politician (~1513–~1560)

Thomas Colly (by 1513 – 1560 or later), of Dover, Kent, was an English politician.

He was a member of parliament (MP) for Dover in April 1554.
