= Sydenham Ward =

Coordinates: 44°13′39″N 76°29′6″W

Sydenham
- Neighbourhood
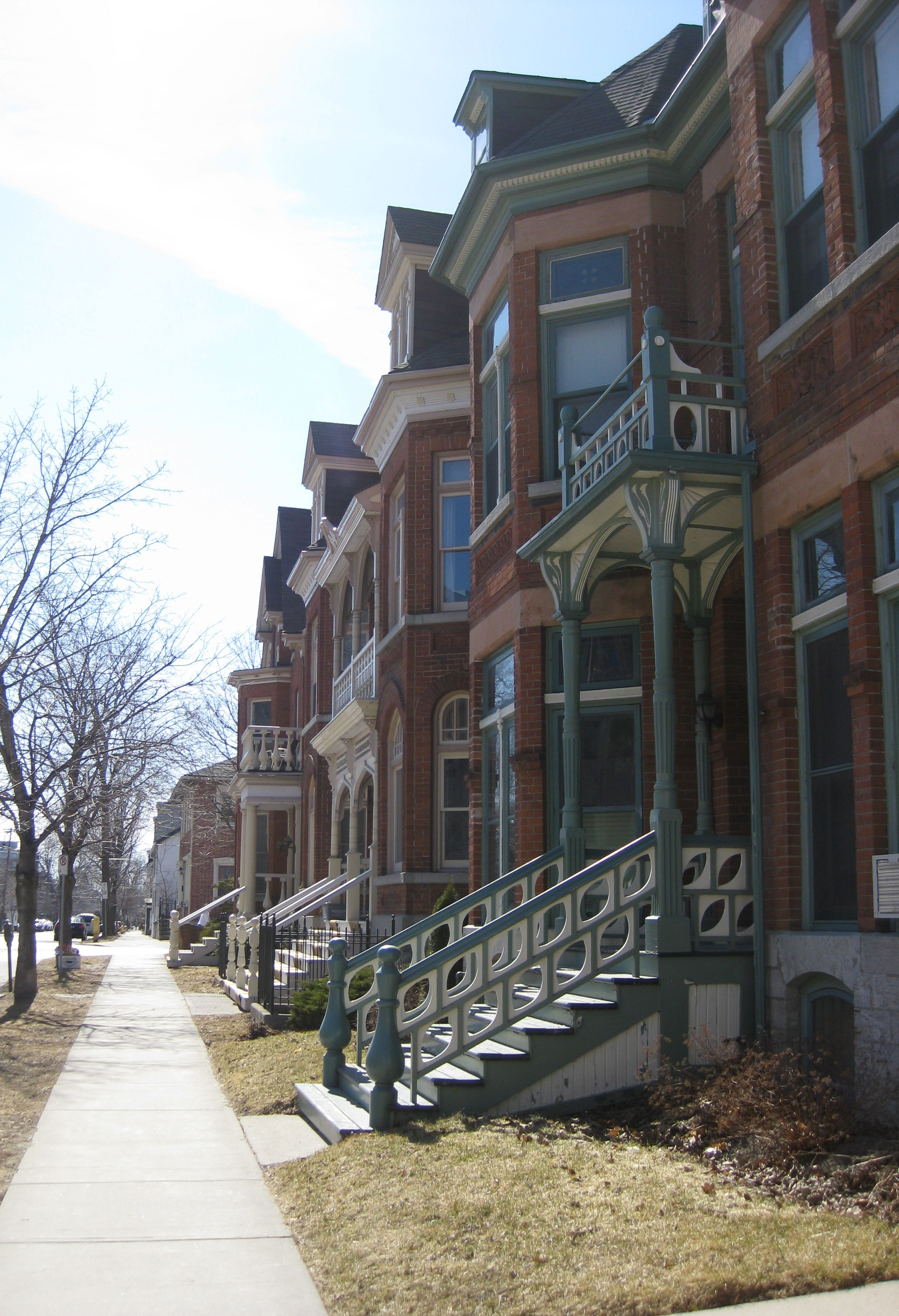
- Historic Homes along King Street
- Interactive map of Sydenham
- Country: Canada
- Province: Ontario
- City: Kingston, Ontario

Population
  - Total: 2,965
- Time zone: UTC-5 (Eastern Time Zone)
  - Summer (DST): UTC-4 (Eastern Time Zone)
- Postal code: K7L
- Area code: 613

Sydenham (commonly referred to as Sydenham Ward) is a central business district located in Kingston, Ontario, Canada. The Sydenham district for census purposes is bounded by Lake Ontario to the south and east, by Princess Street to the north and Barrie Street to the west. These boundaries do not coincide with the Sydenham Ward boundaries for city councillor elections as they include parts of the downtown main street.

The average family income for the area is $85,636 which is considerably higher than the city average. This is attributable to the neighbourhoods proximity to Queen's University. The Sydenham neighbourhood has a mix of business and retail uses on its east and north sides as it approaches Princess Street, which is Kingston's primary downtown business district. The majority of the neighbourhood however is a mix of permanent homes and rental accommodations for students. Many of Kingston's historic limestone structures can be found in the Sydenham neighbourhood.

The neighbourhood is home to Empire Life Financial's Canadian Headquarters at King & Johnson Streets and is one of Kingston's largest employers with 550 full-time employees

== Notable attractions ==
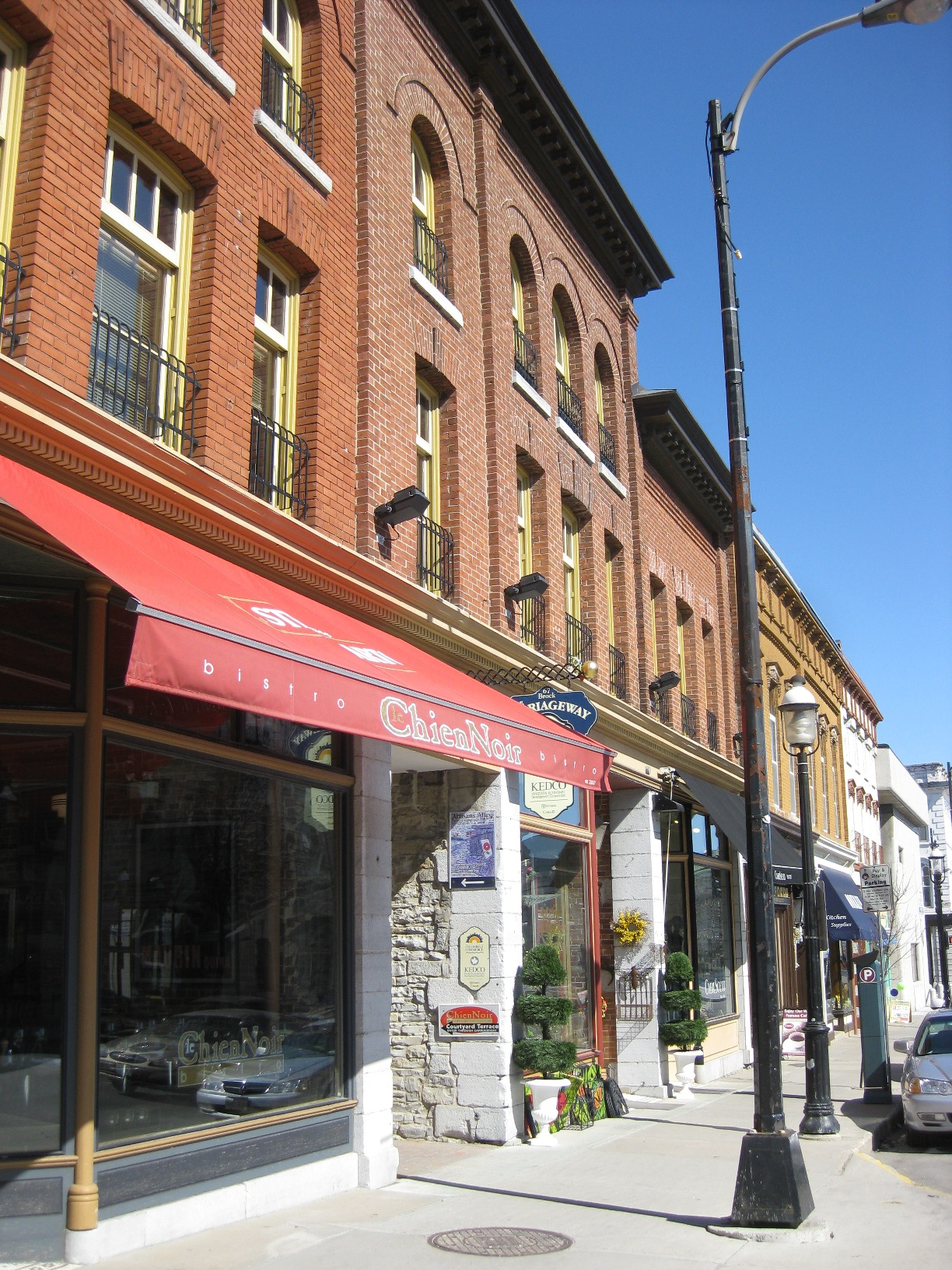
Stores & Restaurants along Brock Street

- Frontenac County Court House
- Kingston City Hall
- Murney Tower
- Marine Museum of the Great Lakes
- Pump House Steam Museum
- Flora McDonald Confederation Basin
- Springer Market Square
- Tourism & Visitors Centre (old Grand Trunk Railway Station)
- Kingston Yacht Club
- St. George's Cathedral
- St. Mary's Cathedral
- Kingston Main Post Office
- Hotel Dieu Hospital
- Kingston Frontenac Public Library - Central Branch

== Education ==
- Sydenham Public School
- Ecole Cathedrale
