= John Garton (MP) =

Former member of Parliament for Dover

John Garton was the member of Parliament for the constituency of Dover for the parliaments of May 1413, November 1414, and 1425.
