= Thomas Vaughan (MP) =

16th-century English politician

Thomas Vaughan (by 1479 – 1543), of Dover, Kent, was an English politician.

Vaughan was a Member of Parliament (MP) for the constituency of Dover in 1523 and 1539.
