= Thomas Arnold (silversmith) =

American silversmith

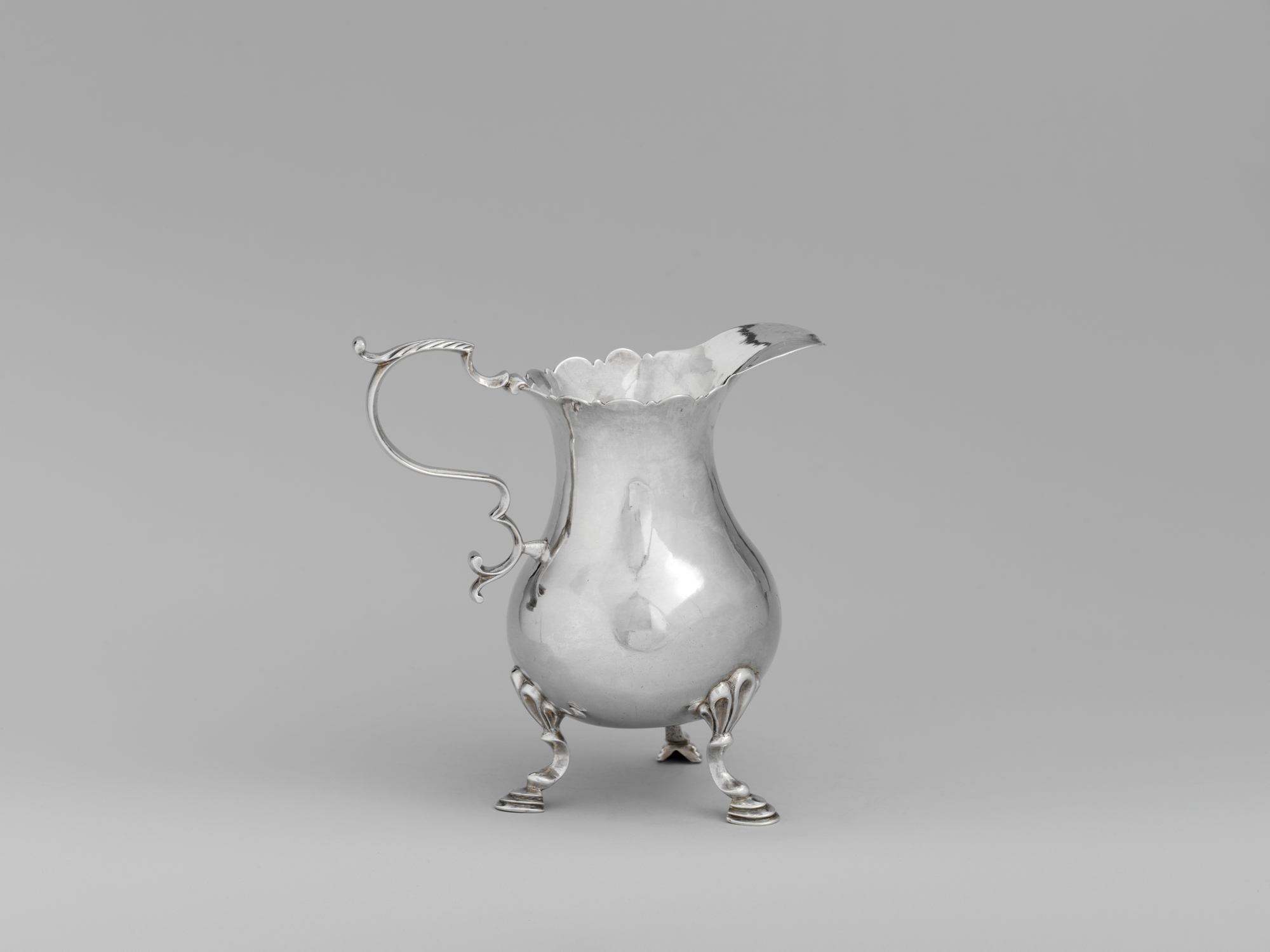
Silver cream pot created by Thomas Arnold

Thomas Arnold (1734 - August 14, 1828) was an American silversmith, active in Newport, Rhode Island.

Arnold was born in Newport and married Eliphal Wyatt on September 16, 1757 in Bristol, Rhode Island. He worked as a silversmith from 1760 until either 1796 or 1817 (dates vary), serving as master to William Stoddard Nichols circa 1798. According to the Newport Mercury of September 12, 1774, he received a master's degree from college in Providence, where he was later elected a member of faculty and in 1800 chosen as a trustee. As a prominent citizen of Newport, in 1774 he served as a delegate to conventions in Philadelphia, in 1789 was appointed Justice of Peace, and in 1817 was appointed Inspector of Customs for the Port of East Greenwich.

Arnold's work is collected in the Metropolitan Museum of Art, Museum of Fine Arts, Boston, and Yale University, as well as the United Congregational Church in Newport.
