= Thomas Arnold (MP) =

English politician

Thomas Arnold was the member of Parliament for the constituency of Dover for the parliament of 1420 and May 1421; and was mayor, deputy mayor, and jurat of Dover.
