= Edward Stephens (MP for Dover) =

English politician

Edward Stephens (born c. 1552), of Dover, Kent, was an English politician.

He was a Member of Parliament (MP) for Dover in 1589.
