= William Granger (priest) =

William James Granger was Dean of Nassau from 1971 until 1980.

Granger was educated at Codrington College and ordained in 1950. After a curacy at St Agnes, Nassau he was the incumbent on Cat Island from 1950 until 1961; and Chaplain at Her Majesty's Prison Fox Hill, Nassau from 1961 until his time as Dean.
