= Pyncheon =

Breed of chicken

- Other names: Pyncheon Bantam
- Country of origin: United States
- Use: ornamental

Traits
- Weight: Male: 24 oz (680 g); Female: 22 oz (620 g)
- Egg color: white
- Comb type: single

Classification
- ABA: single comb, clean legged

The Pyncheon is a rare American breed of true bantam chicken. It is an old breed, developed in the Northeastern United States. The Pyncheon's ancestors are thought to have been brought there from the Netherlands or from Belgium. The breed is mentioned in Nathaniel Hawthorne's The House of the Seven Gables. It is recognized by the American Bantam Association, but not by the American Poultry Association.

== Characteristics ==
The Pyncheon has a single comb followed by a tassel, similar to the Sulmtaler. Often, the comb is not straight due to the crest and veers into an 's' shape. A unique variation of Mille Fleur is the pattern in which they most commonly appear. As with most bantams, it has strong flight capabilities. The Pyncheon is a fair layer of small white eggs. They have a friendly disposition, and a high tendency towards broodiness.

== In The House of the Seven Gables ==
Nathaniel Hawthorne was familiar with the Pyncheon breed, and he bred them himself around the time at which wrote the novel. The chickens in the book mirror the degeneration of the Pyncheon family, whose name they share. Though not explicitly called a bantam, the Pyncheon's small size is referred to several times in the book, as is the breed's antiquity:

Queerly indeed they looked! Chanticleer himself, though stalking on two stilt-like legs, with the dignity interminable descent in all his gestures, was hardly bigger than an ordinary partridge; his two wives were about the size of quails; and as for the one chicken, it looked small enough to be still in the egg, and, at the same time, sufficiently old, withered, wizened, and experienced to have been the founder of the antiquated race.

A comparison is made between the birds and the Pyncheon family; both of whom bear many similarities, including their haughty airs and dolefulness. The "ancient and respectable fowls", like the Pyncheon family, have a long and noble lineage that is now desecrated:

Nor must we forget to mention a hen-coop, of very reverend antiquity, that stood in the farther corner of the garden, not a great way from the fountain. It now contained only Chanticleer, his two wives, and a solitary chicken. All of them were pure specimens of a breed which had been transmitted down as an heirloom in the Pyncheon family, and were said, while in their prime, to have attained almost the size of turkeys, and, on the score of delicate flesh, to be fit for a prince's table. In proof of the authenticity of this legendary renown, Hepzibah could have exhibited the shell of a great egg, which an ostrich need hardly have been ashamed of. Be that as it might, the hens were now scarcely larger than pigeons, and had a queer, rusty, withered aspect, and a gouty kind of movement, and a sleepy and melancholy tone throughout all the variations of their clucking and cackling. It was evident that the race had degenerated, like many a noble race besides, in consequence of too strict a watchfulness to keep it pure. These feathered people had existed too long, in their distinct variety; a fact of which the present representatives, judging from their lugubrious deportment, seemed to be aware. They kept themselves alive, unquestionably, and laid now and then an egg, and hatched a chicken, not for any pleasure of their own, but that the world might not absolutely lose what had once been so admirable a breed of fowls. The distinguishing mark of the hens was a crest, of lamentably scanty growth, in these latter days, but so oddly and wickedly analogous to Hepzibah's turban, that Phoebe – to the poignant distress of her conscience, but inevitably – was led to fancy a general resemblance betwixt these forlorn bipeds and her respectable relative.

The peculiarities of the breed are later described further:

Phoebe, after getting well acquainted with the old hen, was sometimes permitted to take the chicken [the old hen's chick] in her hand, which was quite capable of grasping its cubic inch or two of body. While she curiously examined its hereditary marks – the peculiar speckle of its plumage, the funny tuft on its head, and a knob on each of its legs – the little biped, as she insisted, kept giving her a sagacious wink.

== See also ==
- List of chicken breeds
