= Raben Group =

Dutch logistics company group

- Industry: Logistics
- Founded: 1931
- Founder: Jan W. Raben
- Headquarters: Oss, Netherlands
- Area served: Domestic and international transport, contract logistics, rail transport, intermodal transport
- Number of employees: 12 000
- Website: www.raben-group.com

Raben Group is a Dutch logistics company group. Its operations include international road forwarding, domestic distribution, contract logistics, warehousing, sea and air freight, intermodal transport and logistics services for fresh products (Fresh Logistics).

The first company established by the Raben family started its operations in Meddo/Winterswijk, Netherlands in 1931. Now, Raben Group operates in 17 countries: Netherlands, Poland, Germany, the Czech Republic, Slovakia, Hungary, Romania, Bulgaria, Ukraine, Lithuania, Latvia, Estonia, Austria, Italy, Greece, Romania, Switzerland, Turkey and employs approximately 12,000 people. It has a network of over 170 depots in Europe, over 2,000,000 m2 of warehouse space and transports 17,500,000 shipments annually.
