= Henry Merley =

Member of the Parliament of England

Henry Merley (died c. 1415) was the member of Parliament for the constituency of Dover for the parliaments of 1406 and 1407.
