= John Monyn =

English Member of Parliament

John Monyn (before 1342 – 1419 or after) of Dover, Buckland and Canterbury, Kent, was an English politician.

== Family ==
In 1342 Monyn held the position that would later become the Mayor of Dover. At some point before 1380, Monyn married a woman whose name is unrecorded. Together they had two children, Isabel and Thomas, who also represented Dover in Parliament. (Possibly Thomas Spisor) Before April 1405, Monyn's first wife had died and he married again. His second wife's name is also unrecorded, but they had one daughter, Alice.

== Career ==
He was a Member (MP) of the Parliament of England for Dover in ?1376, 1378, May 1382, September 1388, January 1390, January 1397, September 1397 and for Canterbury in 1419. He was Mayor of Canterbury in September ?1386–87, 1387–88, 1395–96 and 1403–04.
