= John Warren (Dover MP) =

16th-century English politician

John Warren (by 1488 – 1547), of Dover, Kent, was an English politician and a member of parliament.

== Career ==
Warren was a Member of Parliament for Dover in 1510, 1512, 1515, 1536, 1542 and 1545.
