= John Halle (MP for Dover) =

English politician

John Halle (died c. 1409), of Dover, Kent, was an English politician.

== Family ==
Halle was the son of Nicholas atte Halle, an innkeeper who also became an MP and mayor. John married a woman named Isabel and they had one son and two daughters.

== Career ==
He was a Member (MP) of the Parliament of England for Dover in 1371, 1372, 1373, 1376, 1378, 1381, May 1382, October 1382, February 1383, November 1384, 1386 and February 1388. He was Mayor of Dover in the periods September 1371 – 1372, 1373–4, 1380–1, 1388–9, 1391–2 and 1393–4.
