= Harry Gyles =

Australian rules footballer

Personal information
- Full name: Harry John Willmott Gyles
- Born: 28 June 1880; Carlton, Victoria
- Died: 2 February 1959 (aged 78); Parkville, Victoria
- Original team: Richmond Juniors

Playing career^{1}
Years	Club	Games (Goals)
1897	Carlton	1 (0)
- ^{1} Playing statistics correct to the end of 1897.

Harry John Willmott Gyles (28 June 1880 – 2 February 1959) was an Australian rules footballer who played with Carlton in the Victorian Football League (VFL).

== Family ==
One of his sons, Nathaniel Thomas Gyles, who served in the RAAF in World War II, was killed in action in Europe.

== Municipal councillor ==
He was a councillor with the Essendon City Council for 12 years, and was Mayor in 1942–1943.
