= John Alkham =

15th-century English politician

John Alkham (c. 1354 – c. 1433) was the member of Parliament for the constituency of Dover for the parliament of 1407.
