= John Braban =

15th-century English politician

John Braban (died c. 1443) was the member of Parliament for the constituency of Dover for multiple parliaments from October 1416 to 1435.
