= Robert Nethersole =

16th-century English politician

Robert Nethersole (by 1482? – 1556), of Dover, Kent, was an English politician.

Nethersole was a member of parliament (MP) for the constituency of Dover in 1523, 1529 and 1536.
