= William Granger (MP) =

16th-century English politician

William Granger, from Dover, Kent (by 1491 – 1544/1545), was an English politician.

He was a member of parliament (MP) for Dover in 1542.
