= Thomas Warren (MP) =

16th-century English politician

Thomas Warren (by 1513 – 1591), of Dover and Ripple, Kent was an English politician.

He was a Member of Parliament (MP) for Dover in 1547, 1555, 1559, 1563 and 1572.
