= John Cheney (gentleman at arms) =

Member of the Parliament of England

John Cheney (died 19 March 1567) was an English soldier and politician during the Tudor period.

John Cheney was the son of John Cheney Senior of West Woodhay House in Berkshire, by his wife, Jane, the daughter, by his third wife, of Sir William Norreys of Ockwells and Yattendon. His father was a nephew of King Henry VII's friend and cousin, Baron Cheney. John was a gentleman at arms in the Royal household. He was also elected Member of Parliament for Dover (November 1554) and for Winchelsea (1558) through the influence of his father's cousin, Thomas Cheney, the Lord Warden of the Cinque Ports, and then for Berkshire from 1563 to 1567. With a group of others, he attacked and murdered a man named Robert Paris in a sword fight at Newbury, Berkshire in 1550 but was pardoned for it in 1552.

Parliament of England
Preceded by Sir William Fitzwilliam; Sir Henry Neville	Member of Parliament for Berkshire; 1563–1567; With: Sir Henry Neville	Succeeded by Richard Warde; Sir Henry Neville
