= John Gyles (MP) =

English politician

John Gyles (died c. 1406) of Dover, Kent, was an English politician.

== Family ==
He was married, but his wife's name is unrecorded. He had two sons, Peter, a clerk, and Thomas, an MP and king's esquire.

== Career ==
By 1366, he was a tavern owner and in 1368 he was fined 10s for stabbing a man with a dagger. He attended the coronation of Richard II of England as a canopy bearer.

He was a Member (MP) of the Parliament of England for Dover in 1385, 1386, February 1388, September 1388, January 1390, 1391, 1393, 1395 and 1399. He was Mayor of Dover during the periods September 1382 – 1384, 1389–1391, 1392–3, 1399–1400 and 1401–2.
