= William Hannington =

16th-century English politician

William Hannington (by 1530 – 10 May 1607), of Dover and Hougham Court, Kent, was an English politician.

He was a member of parliament (MP) for Dover in November 1554.
