= John Pinchon =

16th-century English politician

John Pinchon (born after 1510 – 29 November 1573), of Writtle, Essex, was a member of parliament (MP) for Dover in 1571.
