= Joseph Beverley (MP) =

16th-century English politician

Joseph Beverley (by 1520 – will made and proven 1561), of Faversham and Dover, Kent, was an English politician. He was a Member of Parliament (MP) for Dover in 1547, 1553, and 1558, and for Winchelsea in 1554.
