= John Minet Fector =

English banker and politician

John Minet Fector (28 March 1812 – 24 February 1868) was an English banker and politician. From 1848 he was called John Minet Laurie.

== Life ==
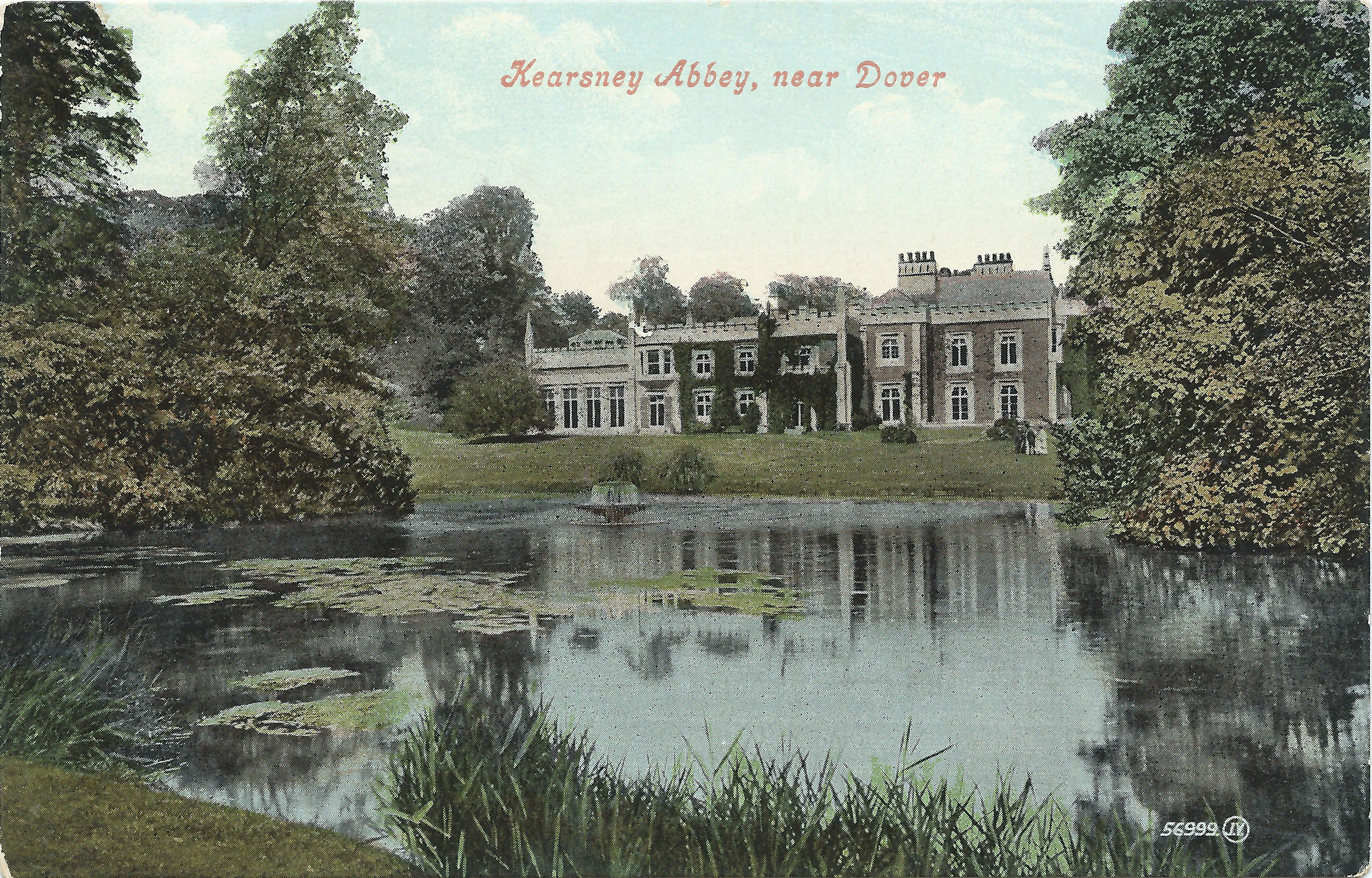
Kearsney Abbey, Temple Ewell, Kent

He was born on 28 March 1812, the eldest son of John Minet Fector (died 1821), and his wife Anne Wortley Montagu Laurie, daughter of Sir Robert Laurie, 5th Baronet. He was educated at Eton College, and matriculated at Trinity College, Cambridge in 1820.

In 1833 Fector took control of the family bank in Dover, J. Minet Fector & Co.; some years later it traded as Fector & Co. In 1835 he was elected Member of Parliament for Dover, as a Tory with moderate reforming ambitions. He lost his seat in 1837, to the Whig Edward Royd Rice. He was elected again, for Maidstone, in 1838. In 1841 he did not contest the seat. In 1842 he sold Fector & Co. to the National Provincial Bank.

Fector added to the house and grounds of Kearsney Abbey, built on the Kearsney Manor estate by his father. He later sold it, around 1845. The building was mostly demolished in 1959. In 1848 his uncle Sir Robert Laurie, 6th Baronet died unmarried, and Fector took the surname Laurie. There also descended to him the Laurie seat in Scotland, Maxwelton House in Glencairn.

He died Middlesex in February 1868 at the age of 55.

== Family ==
Fector married in 1841 Isabella Murray, daughter of General Augustus William Murray. There were no children of the marriage. His sister Charlotte married Sir John Edward George Bayley, 2nd Baronet and was mother of Emilius Bayley. The Fector family survived in this line.
