= List of British Jewish nobility and gentry =

The British nobility consists of the peerage and the gentry. The peerage is a legal system of largely hereditary titles, granted by the British sovereign. Under this system, only the senior family member bears a substantive title (duke, marquess, earl, viscount, baron). The gentry are generally untitled members of the upper classes, however, exceptions include baronets, knights, dames, Scottish feudal barons and lairds.

The history of the Jews in Britain goes back to the reign of William the Conqueror. The first written record of Jewish settlement in England dates from 1070, although Jews may have lived there since Roman times. The Jewish presence continued until King Edward I's Edict of Expulsion in 1290. After the expulsion, there was no Jewish community (apart from individuals who practised Judaism secretly) until the rule of Oliver Cromwell. While Cromwell never officially readmitted Jews to Britain, a small colony of Sephardic Jews living in London was identified in 1656 and allowed to remain. The Jewish Naturalization Act 1753, an attempt to legalise the Jewish presence in Britain, remained in force for only a few months. Practising Jews were finally allowed to sit in Parliament after the passage of the Jews Relief Act 1858, which was a significant step on the path to Jewish emancipation in the United Kingdom.

The first Jewish knight was Sir Solomon de Medina, knighted in 1700, with no further Jews being knighted until 1837, when Queen Victoria knighted Moses Montefiore. Four years later, Isaac Goldsmid was made a baronet, the first Jew to receive a hereditary title. In 1885, Nathan Rothschild, 1st Baron Rothschild, became the first Jew to receive a peerage title.

== Peerage titles ==
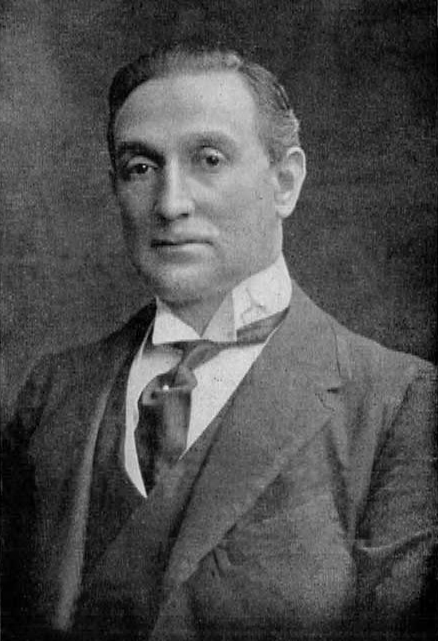
Rufus Isaacs, 1st Marquess of Reading

=== Marquessates ===
- Marquess of Reading
  - Rufus Isaacs, 1st Marquess of Reading
  - Gerald Isaacs, 2nd Marquess of Reading
  - Michael Alfred Rufus Isaacs, 3rd Marquess of Reading
  - Simon Isaacs, 4th Marquess of Reading (Jewish descent)
- Marquess of Cholmondeley
  - George Cholmondeley, 6th Marquess of Cholmondeley (Jewish mother)

=== Earldoms ===
- Earl of Beaconsfield (extinct)
  - Benjamin Disraeli, 1st Earl of Beaconsfield (converted out)
- Earl of Rosebery and Midlothian
  - Harry Primrose, 6th Earl of Rosebery, 2nd Earl of Midlothian (Jewish mother)
- Earl of Harewood
  - David Lascelles, 8th Earl of Harewood (Jewish mother)

=== Viscountcies ===
- Viscount Burnham (extinct)
  - Harry Levy-Lawson, 1st Viscount Burnham
- Viscount Bearsted
  - Marcus Samuel, 1st Viscount Bearsted
  - Walter Samuel, 2nd Viscount Bearsted
  - Marcus Samuel, 3rd Viscount Bearsted
  - Peter Samuel, 4th Viscount Bearsted
  - Nicholas Alan Samuel, 5th Viscount Bearsted
- Viscount Samuel
  - Herbert Samuel, 1st Viscount Samuel
  - Edwin Samuel, 2nd Viscount Samuel
  - David Samuel, 3rd Viscount Samuel
  - Dan Samuel, 4th Viscount Samuel
  - Jonathan Samuel, 5th Viscount Samuel

=== Hereditary baronies ===
==== Extant ====
- Baron Rothschild
  - Nathan Mayer Rothschild, 1st Baron Rothschild
  - Walter Rothschild, 2nd Baron Rothschild
  - Victor Rothschild, 3rd Baron Rothschild
  - Jacob Rothschild, 4th Baron Rothschild
  - Nathaniel Rothschild, 5th Baron Rothschild
- Baron Burnham
  - Edward Levy-Lawson, 1st Baron Burnham
  - Harry Levy-Lawson, 2nd Baron Burnham, created Viscount Burnham
  - William Arnold Webster Levy-Lawson, 3rd Baron Burnham
  - Edward Lawson, 4th Baron Burnham
  - William Edward Harry Lawson, 5th Baron Burnham
  - Hugh Lawson, 6th Baron Burnham
  - Harry Frederick Alan Lawson, 7th Baron Burnham
- Baron Swaythling
  - Samuel Montagu, 1st Baron Swaythling
  - Louis Montagu, 2nd Baron Swaythling
  - Stuart Albert Montagu, 3rd Baron Swaythling
  - David Montagu, 4th Baron Swaythling
  - Charles Montagu, 5th Baron Swaythling
- Baron Mancroft
  - Arthur Samuel, 1st Baron Mancroft
  - Stormont Mancroft, 2nd Baron Mancroft
  - Benjamin Mancroft, 3rd Baron Mancroft
- Baron Nathan
  - Harry Nathan, 1st Baron Nathan
  - Roger Nathan, 2nd Baron Nathan
  - Rupert Harry Bernard Nathan, 3rd Baron Nathan
- Baron Haden-Guest
- Baron Silkin
  - Lewis Silkin, 1st Baron Silkin
- Baron Marks of Broughton
  - Simon Marks, 1st Baron Marks of Broughton
  - Michael Marks, 2nd Baron Marks of Broughton
  - Simon Richard Marks, 3rd Baron Marks of Broughton

==== Extinct ====
- Baron Eardley
  - Sampson Eardley, 1st Baron Eardley (Jewish father)
- Baron Herschell
  - Farrer Herschell, 1st Baron Herschell (Jewish father who converted out)
  - Richard Herschell, 2nd Baron Herschell
  - Rognvald Herschell, 3rd Baron Herschell
- Baron Wandsworth
  - Sydney Stern, 1st Baron Wandsworth
- Baron Pirbright
  - Henry de Worms, 1st Baron Pirbright
- Baron Michelham
  - Herbert Stern, 1st Baron Michelham
  - Herman Alfred Stern, 2nd Baron Michelham
- Baron Jessel
  - Herbert Jessel, 1st Baron Jessel
  - Edward Jessel, 2nd Baron Jessel
- Baron Duveen
  - Joseph Duveen, 1st Baron Duveen
- Baron Melchett
  - Alfred Mond, 1st Baron Melchett
  - Henry Mond, 2nd Baron Melchett
  - Julian Mond, 3rd Baron Melchett
  - Peter Mond, 4th Baron Melchett
- Baron Hore-Belisha
  - Leslie Hore-Belisha, 1st Baron Hore-Belisha
- Baron Conesford
  - Henry Strauss, 1st Baron Conesford
- Baron Cohen of Birkenhead
  - Henry Cohen, 1st Baron Cohen of Birkenhead

=== Life peerages ===
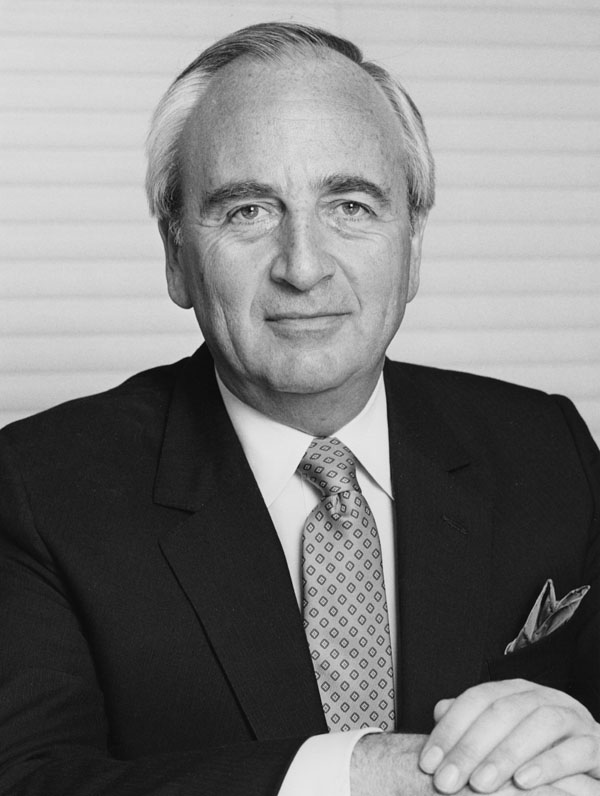
David Young, Baron Young of Graffham

- David Alliance, Baron Alliance
- Alexander Bernstein, Baron Bernstein of Craigweil
- Alma Birk, Baroness Birk
- Leon Brittan, Baron Brittan of Spennithorne
- Lionel Cohen, Baron Cohen
- Bernard Delfont, Baron Delfont
- Terence Etherton, Baron Etherton
- Andrew Feldman, Baron Feldman of Elstree
- Stanley Fink, Baron Fink
- Daniel Finkelstein, Baron Finkelstein
- David Freud, Baron Freud
- Dora Gaitskell, Baroness Gaitskell
- Robert Gavron, Baron Gavron
- Dean Godson, Baron Godson
- Peter Goldsmith, Baron Goldsmith
- Zac Goldsmith, Baron Goldsmith of Richmond Park (Jewish father)
- William Goodhart, Baron Goodhart
- Arnold Goodman, Baron Goodman
- Anthony Grabiner, Baron Grabiner
- Lew Grade, Baron Grade
- Michael Grade, Baron Grade of Yarmouth (Jewish father)
- Susan Greenfield, Baroness Greenfield
- Richard Harrington, Baron Harrington of Watford
- Richard Hermer, Baron Hermer
- Michael Howard, Baron Howard of Lympne
- Sydney Jacobson, Baron Jacobson
- Immanuel Jakobovits, Baron Jakobovits
- Greville Janner, Baron Janner of Braunstone
- Keith Joseph, Baron Joseph
- Lawrence Kadoorie, Baron Kadoorie
- Nigel Lawson, Baron Lawson of Blaby
- Michael Levy, Baron Levy
- Peter Mandelson, Baron Mandelson (Jewish father)
- Yehudi Menuhin, Baron Menuhin
- Claus Moser, Baron Moser
- David Neuberger, Baron Neuberger of Abbotsbury
- Julia Neuberger, Baroness Neuberger
- Monroe Palmer, Baron Palmer of Childs Hill
- David Pannick, Baron Pannick
- Maurice Peston, Baron Peston of Mile End
- Beatrice Plummer, Baroness Plummer
- David Puttnam, Baron Puttnam (Jewish mother)
- Max Rayne, Baron Rayne
- Maurice Saatchi, Baron Saatchi
- Jonathan Sacks, Baron Sacks
- Cyril Salmon, Baron Salmon
- James Sassoon, Baron Sassoon
- Samuel Segal, Baron Segal
- Beatrice Serota, Baroness Serota
- Emanuel Shinwell, Baron Shinwell
- Israel Sieff, Baron Sieff
- Marcus Sieff, Baron Sieff of Brimpton
- Samuel Silkin, Baron Silkin of Dulwich
- Alan Sugar, Baron Sugar
- David Triesman, Baron Triesman
- Leslie Turnberg, Baron Turnberg
- Gordon Wasserman, Baron Wasserman
- Arnold Weinstock, Baron Weinstock
- Robert Winston, Baron Winston
- David Wolfson, Baron Wolfson of Sunningdale
- David Wolfson, Baron Wolfson of Tredegar
- Leonard Wolfson, Baron Wolfson
- Simon Wolfson, Baron Wolfson of Aspley Guise
- Harry Woolf, Baron Woolf
- David Young, Baron Young of Graffham
- Solly Zuckerman, Baron Zuckerman

== Other hereditary titles ==
=== Baronetcies ===
==== Extant ====
- Lopes baronets of Maristow
  - Sir Manasseh Masseh Lopes, 1st Baronet (converted out)
- Rothschild baronets of Grosvenor Place
  - Sir Anthony de Rothschild, 1st Baronet
  - Sir Nathan Rothschild, 2nd Baronet, created Baron Rothschild in 1885
- Jessel baronets of Ladham House
  - Sir Charles James Jessel, 1st Baronet
  - Sir George Jessel, 2nd Baronet
  - Sir Charles John Jessel, 3rd Baronet
  - Sir George Elphinstone Jessel, 4th Baronet
- Tuck baronets of Park Crescent
  - Sir Adolph Tuck, 1st Baronet
  - Sir William Reginald Tuck, 2nd Baronet
  - Sir Bruce Adolph Reginald Tuck, 3rd Baronet
- Leon baronets of Bletchley Park
  - Sir Herbert Samuel Leon, 1st Baronet
  - Sir George Edward Leon, 2nd Baronet
  - Sir Ronald George Leon, 3rd Baronet
  - Sir John Ronald Leon, 4th Baronet
- Yarrow baronets of Homestead
  - Sir Alfred Fernandez Yarrow, 1st Baronet (Jewish mother, but raised as a Christian)
- Magnus baronets of Tangley Hill
  - Sir Philip Magnus, 1st Baronet
  - Sir Philip Magnus-Allcroft, 2nd Baronet
- Cassel baronets of Lincoln's Inn
  - Sir Felix Maximilian Schoenbrunn Cassel, 1st Baronet
  - Sir Francis Edward Cassel, 2nd Baronet
  - Sir Harold Felix Cassel, 3rd Baronet
  - Sir Timothy Felix Harold Cassel, 4th Baronet
- Joseph baronets of Portsoken
  - Sir Samuel Joseph, 1st Baronet
  - Sir Keith Joseph, 2nd Baronet, created a life peer in 1987

==== Extinct ====
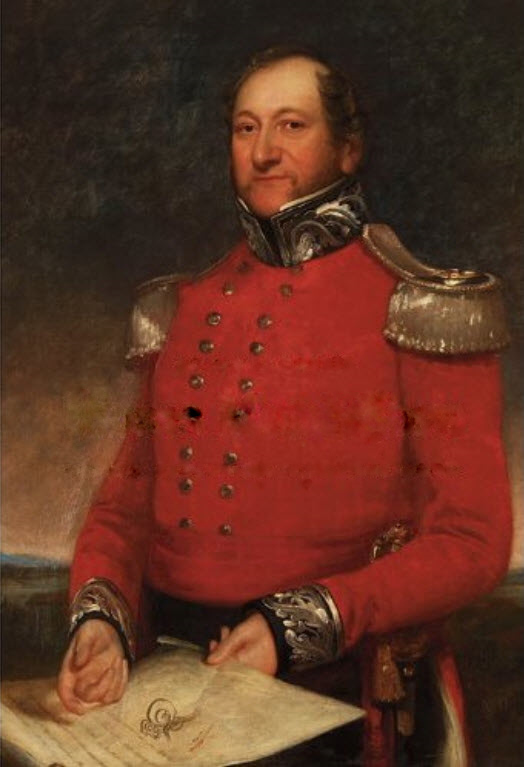
Sir Moses Montefiore, Bt

- Goldsmid baronets of St John's Lodge
  - Sir Isaac Goldsmid, 1st Baronet
  - Sir Francis Henry Goldsmid, 2nd Baronet
  - Sir Julian Goldsmid, 3rd Baronet
- Montefiore baronets of East Cliff Lodge
  - Sir Moses Montefiore, 1st Baronet
- Goldsmid-Stern-Salomons baronets of Broom Hill
  - Sir David Salomons, 1st Baronet
  - Sir David Lionel Goldsmid-Stern-Salomons, 2nd Baronet
- Montefiore baronets of Worth Park
  - Sir Francis Abraham Montefiore, 1st Baronet
- Sassoon baronets of Kensington-gore and of Eastern-terrace
  - Sir Albert Abdullah David Sassoon, 1st Baronet
  - Sir Edward Albert Sassoon, 2nd Baronet
  - Sir Philip Sassoon, 3rd Baronet
- Faudel-Phillips baronets of Grosvenor Gardens and of Queen's Gardens
  - Sir George Faudel Faudel-Phillips, 1st Baronet
  - Sir Benjamin Samuel Faudel-Phillips, 2nd Baronet
  - Sir Lionel Lawson Faudel Faudel-Phillips, 3rd Baronet
- Speyer baronets of Grosvenor Street
  - Sir Edgar Speyer, 1st Baronet
- Sassoon baronets of Bombay
  - Sir Jacob Elias Sassoon, 1st Baronet
  - Sir Edward Elias Sassoon, 2nd Baronet
  - Sir Ellice Victor Sassoon, 3rd Baronet
- David baronets of Bombay
  - Sir Sassoon David, 1st Baronet
  - Sir Percival David, 2nd Baronet
- Oppenheimer baronets of Stoke Poges
  - Sir Bernard Oppenheimer, 1st Baronet
  - Sir Michael Oppenheimer, 2nd Baronet
  - Sir Michael Bernard Grenville Oppenheimer, 3rd Baronet
- Beit baronets of Tewin Water
  - Sir Otto Beit, 1st Baronet
  - Sir Alfred Beit, 2nd Baronet
- Baron baronets of Park Street
  - Sir Louis Baron, 1st Baronet
- D'Avigdor-Goldsmid baronets of Somerhill
  - Sir Osmond Elim d'Avigdor-Goldsmid, 1st Baronet
  - Sir Henry Joseph d'Avigdor-Goldsmid, 2nd Baronet
  - Sir James Arthur d'Avigdor-Goldsmid, 3rd Baronet
- Wolfson baronets of St. Marylebone
  - Sir Isaac Wolfson, 1st Baronet
  - Sir Leonard Wolfson, 2nd Baronet, created a life peer in 1985

=== Scottish feudal baronies ===
- Barony of Craigie
  - Rabbi Robert Owen Thomas

== Other non-hereditary titles ==
=== Judicial lordships ===
- John Dyson, Lord Dyson

=== Knighthoods ===
- Sir Adolphe Abrahams
- Sir Sidney Abrahams
- Sir Ken Adam
- Sir Martyn Arbib
- Sir John Balcombe
- Sir Simon Baron-Cohen
- Sir Victor Blank
- Sir Leonard Blavatnik
- Sir Samuel Brittan
- Sir Israel Brodie
- Sir Bill Browder
- Sir Montague Burton
- Sir Ernest Cassel (converted out)
- Sir Charles Clore
- Sir Jack Cohen
- Sir Jonathan Cohen
- Sir Solomon de Medina (knighted in 1700)
- Sir Lloyd Dorfman
- Sir Geoffrey Elton
- Sir Jacob Epstein
- Sir Anthony Finkelstein
- Sir Clement Freud (converted out)
- Sir Bradley Fried
- Sir Samuel Gluckstein
- Sir James Goldsmith (Jewish father)
- Sir Israel Gollancz
- Sir Philip Green
- Sir Loyd Grossman
- Sir Ralph Halpern
- Sir Basil Henriques
- Sir George Henschel
- Sir Bob Hepple
- Sir George Jessel
- Sir Peter Jonas (Jewish father)
- Sir Ellis Kadoorie
- Sir Elly Kadoorie
- Sir Horace Kadoorie
- Sir Michael Kadoorie
- Sir Sydney Kentridge
- Sir Nasser Khalili
- Sir Ralph Kohn
- Sir Ivan Lawrence
- Sir Oliver Letwin
- Sir Brian Leveson
- Sir Joseph Lyons
- Sir Charles Mendl
- Sir Sigismund Mendl
- Sir Ephraim Mirvis
- Sir Alan Mocatta
- Sir Robert Mond
- Sir Michael Moritz
- Sir Stirling Moss (paternal grandfather was Jewish)
- Sir Ernest Oppenheimer (converted out)
- Sir Francis Palgrave
- Sir Nikolaus Pevsner (converted out)
- Sir Karl Popper (Jewish grandparents)
- Sir Leslie Porter
- Sir Malcolm Rifkind
- Sir Tony Robinson
- Sir William Rothenstein
- Sir Isidore Salmon
- Sir Samuel Isidore Salmon
- Sir Harry Samuel
- Sir András Schiff
- Sir Joseph Sebag-Montefiore
- Sir Nicholas Serota
- Sir Peter Shaffer
- Sir Grant Shapps
- Sir Sebag Shaw
- Sir Henry Slesser (converted out)
- Sir Michael Sobell
- Sir Harry Solomon
- Sir Georg Solti
- Sir Martin Sorrell
- Sir Isidore Spielmann
- Sir Tom Stoppard
- Sir Geoffrey Vos
- Sir Nicholas Winton (converted out)
- Sir Henry Drummond Wolff

==== Honorary knighthoods ====
- Daniel Barenboim, KBE
- Michael Bloomberg, KBE
- Naum Gabo, KBE
- Lou Gerstner, KBE
- Alan Greenspan, KBE
- Sol Kerzner, KCMG
- Henry Kissinger, KCMG
- Ralph Lauren, KBE
- André Previn, KBE
- Arthur Rubinstein, KBE
- Mortimer Sackler, KBE
- Raymond Sackler, KBE
- Stephen A. Schwarzman, KBE
- Steven Spielberg, KBE
- Simon Wiesenthal, KBE
- James Wolfensohn, KBE

== See also ==
- Court Jew
- History of the Jews in England
- Jewish heraldry
- List of European Jewish nobility
