= List of baronetcies in the Baronetage of the United Kingdom: J =

Peerages and baronetcies of Britain and Ireland
Extant	All
Dukes	Dukedoms
Marquesses	Marquessates
Earls	Earldoms
Viscounts	Viscountcies
Barons	Baronies
Baronets	Baronetcies
En, Ire, NS, GB, UK (extinct)

This is a list of baronetcies in the Baronetage of the United Kingdom. They have been created since 1801 when they replaced the baronetages in the Baronetage of Great Britain, and Baronetage of Ireland. This list is not currently complete.

Title	Date of creation	Surname	Current status	Notes
Jackson of Arlsey	1815	Jackson	dormant	sixth Baronet died 1980
Jackson of Birkenhead	1869	Jackson, Mather-Jackson	extant	
Jackson of Fort Hill	1813	Jackson	extinct 1851	
Jackson of Stansted House	1902	Jackson	extant	
Jackson of Wandsworth	1935	Jackson	extinct 1937	
Jackson of Wimbledon	1913	Jackson	extant	
Jaffray of Edgehill	1931	Jaffray	extinct 1953	
Jaffray of Skilts and Park Grove	1892	Jaffray	extant	
James of Dublin	1823	James	extinct 1979	Lord Mayor of Dublin
Jameson of Down Street	1911	Jameson	extinct 1917	
Jardine of Castle Milk	1885	Jardine, Buchanan-Jardine	extant	
Jardine of Godalming	1916	Jardine	extant	
Jardine of Nottingham	1919	Jardine	extinct 1965	
Jarvis of Hascombe	1922	Jarvis	extinct 1965	
Jehanghir of Bombay	1908	Jehanghir	extant	
Jejeebhoy of Bombay	1857	Jejeebhoy	extant	
Jenks of Cheape	1932	Jenks	extant	Lord Mayor of London
Jenner of Harley Street	1868	Jenner	extinct 1954	
Jephcott of East Portlemouth	1962	Jephcott	extant	
Jephson-Norreys of Mallow	1838	Jephson-Norreys	extinct 1888	
Jephson of Spring Vale	1815	Jephson	extinct 1900	
Jervoise, later Clarke-Jervoise of Idsworth	1813	Jervoise, Clarke-Jervoise	extinct 1933	
Jessel of Ladham House	1883	Jessel	extant	
Jessel of Westminster	1917	Jessel	extinct 1990	first Baronet created Baron Jessel in 1924
Johnson-Ferguson of Springhall and Wiston	1906	Johnson-Ferguson	extant	
Johnson of Bath	1818	Johnson	dormant	sixth Baronet died 1986 - under review
Johnson of Dublin	1909	Johnson	extinct 1918	
Johnston of London	1916	Johnston	extinct 1933	Lord Mayor of London
Joicey of Chester-le-Street	1893	Joicey	extant	first Baronet created Baron Joicey in 1906
Jolliffe of Merstham	1821	Jolliffe	extant	first Baronet created Baron Hylton in 1866
Jones Brydges of Boultibrook	1807	Jones Brydges	extinct 1891	
Jones-Parry of Madryn Castle	1886	Jones-Parry	extinct 1891	
Jones of Cranmer Hall	1831	Jones, Lawrence-Jones	extant	
Jones of Pentower	1917	Jones	extinct 1952	
Jones of Rhyll	1926	Jones, Probyn-Jones	extinct 1951	
Jones of Treeton	1919	Jones	extant	
Joseph of Portsoken	1943	Joseph	dormant	Lord Mayor of London; second Baronet created a life peer as Baron Joseph in 1987, which title became extinct in 1994; second Baronet died 1994
Joseph of Stoke-on-Trent	1942	Joseph	extinct 1951	
Joynson-Hicks of Holmbury	1919	Joynson-Hicks	extant	first Baronet created Viscount Brentford in 1929
Joynson-Hicks of Newick	1956	Joynson-Hicks	extant	first Baronet succeeded as Viscount Brentford in 1958
Judkin-Fitzgerald of Lisheen	1801	Judkin-Fitzgerald	extinct or dormant 1917	
