= Lampl =

Lampl is a surname. Notable people with the surname include:

- Cody Lampl (born 1986), American-German ice hockey player
- Frank Lampl (1926–2011), Czech-British businessman
- Kenneth Lampl (born 1964), American composer and lecturer
- Peter Lampl (born 1947), British philanthropist
