= Edward William Barnett =

British politician

Edward Barnett MP

Member of Parliament for Dover
- In office 23 September 1873 – 31 January 1874 Serving with Alexander George Dickson
- Preceded by: George Jessel
- Succeeded by: Charles Freshfield

Personal details
- Born: 1835 Walsall, England
- Died: March 1895 (aged 59–60) Paddington, London, England
- Party: Conservative
- Spouse: Emily Bonnycastle (m. 1867)

Edward William Barnett (1835 - March 1895) was a Conservative Party politician.

He first contested Dover at the 1871 by-election, but was unsuccessful. He was then elected MP for the constituency in another by-election in 1873 before being defeated at the next election in 1874.

The short duration of his term from his election, which took place in an autumn recess, to the 1874 general election meant Barnett never took his seat in the House of Commons.

Parliament of the United Kingdom
Preceded by Alexander George Dickson and George Jessel	Member of Parliament for Dover; 1873 – 1874; With: Alexander George Dickson	Succeeded by Alexander George Dickson and Charles Freshfield
