= 1896 St Pancras South by-election =

UK Parliamentary by-election

The 1896 St Pancras South by-election was held on 28 January 1896 following the death of the incumbent Liberal Unionist MP, Sir Julian Goldsmid on 7 January 1896.

== Candidates ==
The Liberal Unionist candidate was Herbert Jessel. Jessel was the son-in-law of Sir Julian Goldsmid and had been a captain of the 17th Lancers. The Conservative Party was in an alliance with the Liberal Unionist Party and supported Jessel.

The Liberal Party candidate was George Montagu Harris. Harris had contested this constituency at the previous general election.

Nominations closed on 24 January 1896.

== Result ==
1896 St Pancras South by-election
| Party | Candidate | Votes | % | ±% |
|---|---|---|---|---|
| Liberal Unionist | Herbert Jessel | 2,631 | 65.7 | −0.8 |
| Liberal | George Montagu Harris | 1,375 | 34.3 | +0.8 |
| Majority | | 1,256 | 31.4 | −1.6 |
| Turnout | | 4,006 | 72.3 | +6.3 |
| Registered electors | | 5,544 | | |
| Liberal Unionist hold | | Swing | −0.8 | |
