= Jessel baronets of Ladham (1883) =

Escutcheon of the Jessel baronets of Ladham

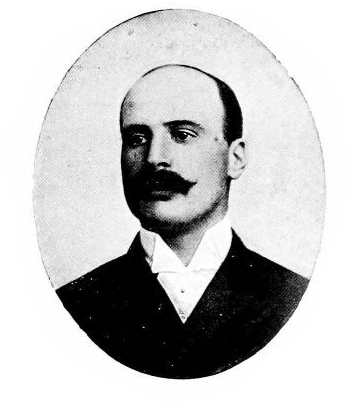
Sir Charles Jessel, 1st Baronet

The Jessel baronetcy, of Ladham House in the parish of Goudhurst in the County of Kent, was created in the Baronetage of the United Kingdom on 25 May 1883 for Charles Jessel, in honour of his father, the prominent lawyer and judge Sir George Jessel, Master of the Rolls from 1873 to 1883. The 1st Baronet was later High Sheriff of Kent in 1903.

== Jessel baronets, of Ladham (1883) ==
- Sir Charles James Jessel, 1st Baronet (1860–1928)
- Sir George Jessel, 2nd Baronet (1891–1977)
- Sir Charles John Jessel, 3rd Baronet (1924–2022)
- Sir George Elphinstone Jessel, 4th Baronet (born 1957)

The heir apparent is the current holder's son, Charles Jack Jessel (born 2000).

== Notes ==
Baronetage of the United Kingdom
Preceded by Wells baronets	Jessel baronets of Ladham House; 25 May 1883	Succeeded by Hewett baronets
