= Hewett baronets of Chesterfield Street (1883) =

Escutcheon of the Hewett baronets of Chesterfield Street

The Hewett baronetcy, of Chesterfield Street, in the parish of St George, Hanover Square in the County of Middlesex, was created in the Baronetage of the United Kingdom on 6 August 1883 for Prescott Gardner Hewett, a surgeon.

== Hewett baronets, of Chesterfield Street, London (1883) ==
- Sir Prescott Gardner Hewett, 1st Baronet (1812–1891)
- Sir Harry Hammerton Hewett, 2nd Baronet (1853–1891). Extinct on his death.

== Notes ==
Baronetage of the United Kingdom
Preceded by Jessel baronets	Hewett baronets of Chesterfield Street; 6 August 1883	Succeeded by Clark baronets
