= 1873 Dover by-election =

English by-election

The 1873 Dover by-election was fought on 22 September 1873. The by-election was fought due to the Resignation of the incumbent MP of the Liberal Party, Sir George Jessel, to become Master of the Rolls. It was won by the Conservative candidate Edward William Barnett.
