= Re Rica Gold Washing Co =

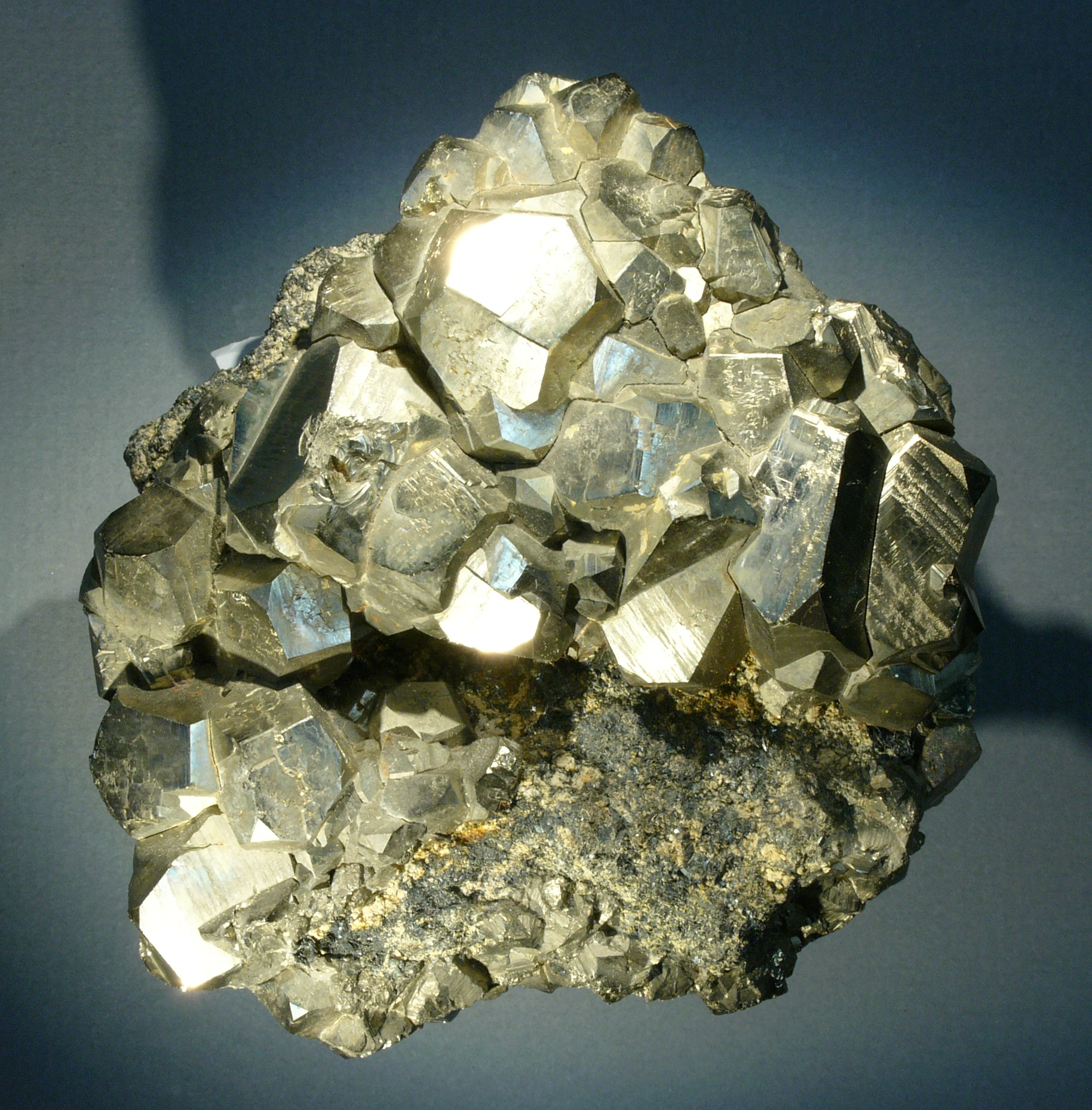
- Court: Court of Appeal
- Decided: 19 February 1879
- Citation: (1879) 11 Ch D 36

Court membership
- Judges sitting: Sir George Jessel MR; Brett LJ; Bramwell LJ

Case opinions
- Sir George Jessel MR

Keywords
- Liquidation

Re Rica Gold Washing Co (1879) 11 Ch D 36 is a UK insolvency law case concerning the liquidation when a company is unable to repay its debts. It held that a shareholder, to having standing to bring a winding up petition must have a sufficient tangible interest in what is left over after winding up.

== Facts ==
A member of the company wished to petition to wind up the company, a gold mining operation in "Colombia". He held 75 fully paid up £1 shares.

Hall VC dismissed the petition, holding that his interest was not sufficient.

== Judgment ==
Sir George Jessel MR said for a fully paid up shareholder, ‘it must be that after full payment of all the debts and liabilities of the company there will remain a surplus divisible among the shareholders of sufficient value to authorise him to present a petition.’ This shareholder, with 75 paid up £1 shares, did not have sufficient tangible interest. His judgment went as follows.

The petition is the petition of a clergyman, who says that he holds seventy-five shares of £1 each in the company. He does not tell us when he acquired them, but he says that he purchased them in the market. The only allegation that I can find as to how long he has been a shareholder, is, that he is now, and for six months past has been, the holder of the shares. Of course it is consistent with that that he has been a holder for a longer period. He does not tell us exactly when the company was registered, but he says that it was registered shortly after the 19th of March, 1872. Therefore we may take the establishment of the company to have been in March, 1872, and the petition in question was presented on the 25th of October, 1878, which is more than six years after the formation of the company. The Petitioner's shares are fully paid up.

Now I will say a word or two on the law as regards the position of a Petitioner holding fully paid-up shares. He is not liable to contribute anything towards the assets of the company, and if he has any interest at all, it must be that after full payment of all the debts and liabilities of the company there will remain a surplus divisible among the shareholders of sufficient value to authorize him to present a petition. That being his position, and the rule being that the Petitioner must succeed upon allegations which are proved, of course the Petitioner must shew the Court by sufficient allegation that he has a sufficient interest to entitle him to ask for the winding-up of the company. I say “a sufficient interest,” for the mere allegation of a surplus or of a probable surplus will not be sufficient. He must shew what I may call a tangible interest. I am not going to lay down any rule as to what that must be, but if he shewed only that there was such a surplus as, on being fairly divided, irrespective of the coats of the winding-up, would give him £5, I should say that would not be sufficient to induce the Court to interfere in his behalf.

That being the state of the law, I will first of all mention generally how this petition is wrong, and then I will discuss it a little in detail. The petition contains vague allegations of fraud; but I have always understood it to be a rule in equity that where you allege fraud you must state the facts which constitute the fraud. You are not entitled on a petition any more than in an action to say to the other side, “You have defrauded me; you have obtained my money by fraud.” You must state the facts which you say amount to a fraud, so that the other party may know what he has to meet. I agree that it is not necessary to state the evidence which shews the fraud, but you must state the facts which constitute the fraud. In the next place, of course you must shew that the relief to be obtained on the ground of the fraud would increase the assets of the company; and even then I am not prepared to go this length, that if a petitioner shews that there are no other possible available assets except those which may be obtained by the successful prosecution of proceedings against directors or others to get back money which they are liable to pay by reason of some fraud committed, that would as a general rule be sufficient to support a winding-up petition. I think it would not. I think the rule should be as a general rule, first establish your fraud, and get the money, and then present your petition to divide it—for that is the object of a winding-up petition by a fully paid-up shareholder. There will be, no doubt, some exceptions. One which I think worth mentioning is where the majority of the shareholders side with the directors or other persons who have committed the fraud, and so prevent the company's bringing an action to make them liable. In that case I can well understand the Court saying that, as the minority of the shareholders who are entitled to complain of the fraud cannot themselves institute an action in the name of the company, they may invoke the assistance of the Court to wind up the company, so that by the means of the liquidation such an action may be brought or proceedings may be taken under the 165th clause of the Companies Act.

Having said thus much, I will state what the allegations are, and why I think them vague and unsatisfactory. The first allegation is contained in paragraph 2 of the petition, which states this:—[His Lordship read the second paragraph.] That is not an allegation of fraud at all. Promoters, I should imagine, do not intend to work for nothing, or to work otherwise than for profits, and generally for large profits. Then it states the names of the companies, and then it states this:—[His Lordship read paragraph 4.] On first reading this clause I thought that it might possibly amount to an allegation that the majority of the share-holders sided with the persons accused of fraud, but when you come to examine it, it does not amount to that. It obviously relates to the management of the business of the company, and does not shew that the directors will necessarily command a majority in general meeting. Then the 5th paragraph states this:—[His Lordship read the paragraph.] That is open to the objection of being a vague and indefinite charge of illegality of some kind. I cannot find out what the directors have done. It says that there have been some contrivances in connection with the formation of the company and the sale of the shares therein. What does that mean? To whom did they sell the shares? It is said that they have made profits. What profits? How have they made profits? At whose expense? There is not a word of allegation to shew that the profits they have made have been by misappropriating the assets of the company, and besides that, the Petitioner lumps together the charges as to the three companies and the promoters, and he has not said that they have made a shilling of profit separately out of this company. It is quite consistent with the allegation that they made large profits out of the other two companies and none out of this. That may be called hypercritical, but when we come to deal with vague allegations of this kind I think no criticism is too severe. People are not to be brought into Court on a vague charge of fraud of this kind. Then the Petitioner goes on to say that “he was induced to become and still is a shareholder in each of the said companies. He has caused to be prepared and intends to present petitions for winding up the said Malpaso Gold Washing Company, Limited, and the said Malabar Gold Washing Company Limited, concurrently with the present petition. The Petitioner craves leave to refer to the said petitions respectively.” Then he states that there were a memorandum and articles of association, by which it appears that a certain contract was made, but there is no allegation that the contract which was a contract for the purchase of a mine was ever carried out. Then we have this allegation:—[His Lordship read clause 15.] That, again, is a vague and most improper charge of fraud. It is not sufficient to say that the prospectus contained various untrue, misleading, and deceptive statements. The Petitioner ought to say what they were, and state which of them were untrue. Besides that, it does not appear that that prospectus was a representation made to the company at all, or one upon which the company can maintain an action or obtain damages or compensation to increase the amount of its assets. Then there is a reference (paragraph 16) to one of its promoters, who was a broker, and who sent out a circular called “ The Investment Circular ,” in which he spoke in very high terms of the company. [His Lordship then read the 18th and 19th paragraphs.] He does not say that he was induced by the circular or by the prospectus to buy, but simply that he bought. If he were defrauded, of course his remedy would be an action as an individual against the person or persons who defrauded him; but that would not in the least increase the assets of the company. [His Lordship then read the 20th paragraph of the petition.] That is an allegation of insolvency, certainly of commercial insolvency, but there is nothing else in the petition to shew assets. There is nothing to shew that any one of these alleged frauds ended in abstracting moneys from the assets of the company which the parties committing the fraud are liable to pay. Therefore, really, when the petition is fairly looked at, there is no allegation of any assets left, much less of there being any surplus in which the Petitioner could participate after payment of the debts and costs of the winding-up. It seems to me as clearly a demurrable petition as I ever saw.

But what was the case presented to us in argument? It was a totally different one. It was said that the mine was sold to the company under circumstances which would entitle the company either to rescind the contract or to obtain from the persons who sold it a very large sum of money, stated at £20,000. The answer is that there is not a word of this in the petition. There is no allegation of the sale, or of the completion of the purchase, or of the payment of the money, or that the money came out of the coffers of the company, or that anybody is liable to repay it. Those allegations ought to have been made if any reliance is to be placed upon such a case.

I have to add one word more about the amount of the Petitioner's claim. I am sorry to say I have had a very lengthened experience in winding-up cases, both at the Bar and on the Bench, and I cannot believe that a shareholder who has seventy-five £1 paid-up shares can imagine that he has sufficient interest to make it worth his while to present a winding-up petition. Of course I am not going to say there might not be a case in which £75 would be payable to him, but it is very unlikely and very improbable. We must look at the extent of his interest as reasonable men, and as men having experience in these matters, and speaking as such, I have no doubt that, as the Vice-Chancellor says, this is not a bonâ fide petition, but a petition presented with a very different object than that of obtaining for the Petitioner the £75, or any part of it. In my opinion it is either presented for the purpose of obtaining costs, or for the purpose of annoyance to some other person or persons; and I entirely agree with the Vice-Chancellor that it is not a bonâ fide petition. Therefore I think we must dismiss this appeal.

Brett LJ and Bramwell LJ concurred.

== See also ==
- UK insolvency law
