= Alexander George Dickson =

British politician

Alexander George Dickson (1834 – 4 July 1889) was a British Conservative Party politician who served as the Member of Parliament in the British House of Commons for Dover.

Dickson was born at Belchester, a stately home in Berwickshire, Scotland in 1834. He joined the 13th Light Dragoons in 1853 and reached the rank of Major. In 1863 he became Captain in the Royal East Kent Regiment of Mounted Rifles Yeomanry Cavalry. He stood for parliament at Dover in 1865 and retained the seat until his death in 1889.

He married as her second husband Charlotte Maria Eden, widow of Dudley North, Lord North, son of Francis North, 6th Earl of Guilford.

Parliament of the United Kingdom
Preceded by William Nicol; Henry John Leeke	Member of Parliament for Dover; 1865 – 1889; With: Charles Freshfield to 1868; George Jessel 1868–1873, 1874–1885; Edward William Barnett 1873–1874	Succeeded by George Wyndham
