= Philip Whitwell Wilson =

Philip Whitwell Wilson

Philip Whitwell Wilson (1875 – 6 June 1956) was a British Liberal Party politician, writer and journalist. He served as an MP from 1906 to 1910. Using the byline "P. W. Wilson", he later was a frequent contributor to The New York Times.

== Early life ==
Wilson was born in Westmorland, Cumbria, the son of I. Whitwell Wilson, a justice of the peace, and Annie Bagster. He was educated at Kendal Grammar School and Clare College, Cambridge. At Cambridge he was President of the Cambridge Union, and was also one of the first editors of the literary magazine Granta.

== Politics ==
At the 1906 general election, he was elected as the Liberal member of parliament (MP) for St Pancras South, winning the seat from the Liberal Unionists by the slender margin of 61 votes. The Liberal Unionists regained the seat at the January 1910 general election and Wilson switched to the Westmorland seat of Appleby, which he contested unsuccessfully at the December 1910 general election, finishing second.

== Career ==
In 1910 he became the parliamentary correspondent for the Daily News, a position he held for the next twelve years. He was also the American correspondent for the Daily News. He wrote a number of religious books. He was also a supporter of the Settlement Movement, which brought together his religious and political ideas.

In 1925, Wilson began a long association with The New York Times. He regularly wrote Sunday feature articles and book reviews under the byline "P. W. Wilson".

== Personal life ==
Wilson was married twice, first to Alice Collins, who died in 1939 and with whom he had five children, and then to Mary Cross, who died in 1951. Both of his wives were American, and he latterly lived in New York City, where he died in 1956.

Parliament of the United Kingdom
Preceded by Herbert Jessel	Member of Parliament for St Pancras South; 1906 – January 1910	Succeeded by Herbert Jessel
