= 1871 Dover by-election =

UK parliamentary by-election

The 1871 Dover by-election was held on 25 November 1871. The byelection was held due to the incumbent Liberal MP, George Jessel, becoming Solicitor General for England and Wales. It was retained by Jessel with a reduced majority There was a riot following the result.

Dover by-election, 1871
Party	Candidate	Votes	%	±%
Liberal	George Jessel	1,231	51.8	
Conservative	Mr. Barnett	1,143	48.2	
Majority		88	3.6	
Turnout		2.374		
Liberal hold		Swing		
