= William Nicol (surgeon) =

Scottish surgeon and Conservative Member of Parliament

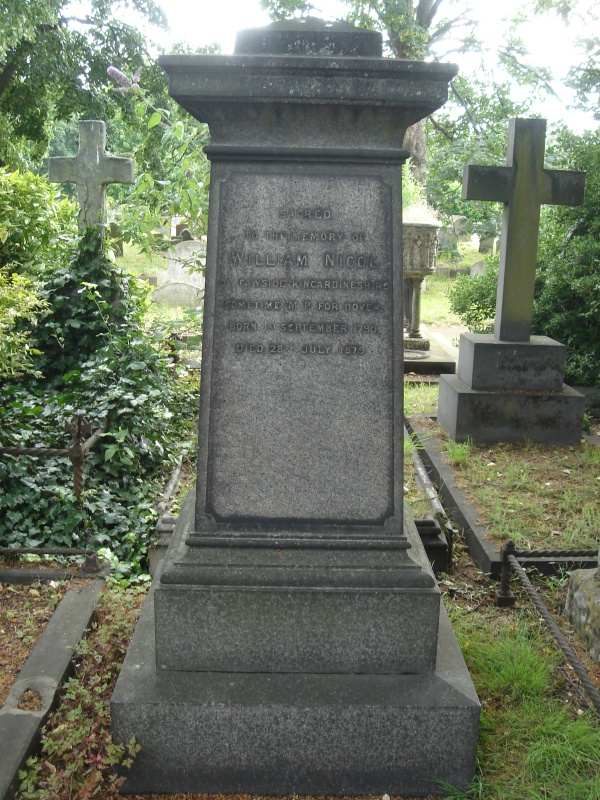
Funerary monument, Brompton Cemetery, London

William Nicol DL (15 September 1790 – 8 August 1879) was a Scottish surgeon, founder of the firm William Nicol and Company, and Conservative Party Member of Parliament for Dover.

== Early years ==
He was born 15 September 1790 at Fawsyde, in the parish of Kinneff, in the Mearns, with parents of James Nicol (1767–1849) and his first wife Helen Barclay. His sibling was James (1796–1820), and had three step-siblings. He was educated in Aberdeen.

In 1810, Nicol went to Bombay on board East India Company's ship Carmarthen as surgeon.

== Bombay ==
Nicol settled in Bombay in 1820 and founded the firm of William Nicol & Company in Bombay, in 1820. He married his cousin Margaret Dyce Nicol (1799–1860) in Bombay on 4 January 1822. He left Bombay in 1828. Nicol retired from the company in 1839, and returned to England.

The company later failed with the 1878 "spectacular collapse" of the City of Glasgow Bank (1839–1877). (After exploration by geologist Robert Brough Smyth, together with Fleming and Company, it was found in February 1879 the companies owned land and mining rights to newly discovered gold in the Wayanad district, and Nelliallum district, separate to existing coffee estates about the Seputtee river around the Neilgherries.)

== Return to Britain ==
Nicol was member of parliament for Dover from 1859 to 1865.

Nicol also became a justice of the peace and deputy lieutenant for Kincardineshire.

Nicol died in London on 8 August 1879, and is buried in Brompton Cemetery, London, and his wife in a family plot in Liverpool.

He had no issue.

== See also ==
- James Dyce Nicol, business partner

Parliament of the United Kingdom
Preceded by Sir William Russell, Bt. Ralph Bernal Osborne	Member of Parliament for Dover; 1859 – 1865; With: Sir Henry Leeke	Succeeded by Charles Freshfield; Alexander George Dickson
