= Baron Jessel =

Title in the Peerage of the United Kingdom

Baron Jessel, of Westminster in the County of London, was a title in the Peerage of the United Kingdom. It was created on 8 January 1924 for Sir Herbert Jessel, 1st Baronet, who had earlier represented St Pancras South in Parliament as a Liberal Unionist from 1896 to 1906 and as a Conservative from 1910 to 1918. He had already been created a Baronet, of Westminster in the County of London, in the Baronetage of the United Kingdom 1917. Jessel was the younger son of Sir George Jessel, Solicitor-General and Master of the Rolls, and the younger brother of Sir Charles Jessel, 1st Baronet, who was created a Baronet in 1883 in recognition of his father's services. Lord Jessel was succeeded by his son, the second Baron, who served as a Deputy Speaker of the House of Lords from 1963 to 1977. Both titles became extinct on his death on 13 June 1990.

== Barons Jessel (1924) ==
- Herbert Merton Jessel, 1st Baron Jessel (1866–1950)
- Edward Herbert Jessel, 2nd Baron Jessel (1904–1990)
  - Hon. Timothy Edward Jessel (1935–1969)

== See also ==
- Sir George Jessel
- Jessel Baronets, of Ladham
