= Wells baronets of Upper Grosvenor Street (1883) =

Escutcheon of the Wells baronets of Upper Grosvenor Street

The Wells baronetcy of Upper Grosvenor Street in the County of London, was created in the Baronetage of the United Kingdom on 11 May 1883 for the prominent surgeon Thomas Spencer Wells, President of the Royal College of Surgeons of England for 1882/3.

The 2nd Baronet died unmarried in 1906. The 3rd Baronet, a millionaire businessman in the United States, died at Broadway in Gloucestershire in 1910.

On the death of the childless 4th Baronet in 1945, his younger brother and heir, Preston Albert Wells Sr., did not exhibit proofs of succession. The title does not appear on the Official Roll.

== Wells baronets of Upper Grosvenor Street (1883) ==
- Sir Thomas Spencer Wells, 1st Baronet (1818–1898)
- Sir Arthur Spencer Wells, 2nd Baronet (1866–1906)
- Sir Thomas Edmund Wells, 3rd Baronet (1855–1910)
- Sir John Edward Wells, 4th Baronet (1881–1945)

== Extended family ==
Preston Albert Wells Sr. was the father of Dick Wells.

== Notes ==
Baronetage of the United Kingdom
Preceded by Clarke baronets	Wells baronets of Upper Grosvenor Street; 11 May 1883	Succeeded by Jessel baronets
