= Charles Freshfield =

Charles Kaye Freshfield (11 March 1808 – 6 July 1891) was a 19th-century lawyer and Conservative Party Member of Parliament in the British House of Commons.

Freshfield was born in Lothbury, London the son of James William Freshfield and his wife Mary Blacket. His father was a lawyer who established the firm of Freshfields. The family moved to Abney House near Stoke Newington and Charles Freshfield was educated at Charterhouse School. He qualified as a solicitor in 1834 and joined the family firm. He was Solicitor to the Bank of England from 1840 to 1869 when he retired from Freshfields. During his time at Freshfields he was heavily involved with the London, Brighton and South Coast Railway, until the latter got into financial difficulties in 1867. He was subsequently a Director of the East Indian Railway Company and the Ottoman Smyrna Railway. He lived at Hampstead and later at Upper Gatton Park, Merstham, Surrey, and also had a residence at 21 Half Moon Street. He became Member of Parliament for Dover in 1865. He lost his seat in 1868, but was re-elected in January 1874 and April 1880. He retired from parliament in 1885. Later, he settled in Brighton and lived for some years at Pennant Lodge in the north-west corner of Queen's Park. He was a member of the Council of Brighton College. At the time of his death he lived at Collingwood House on Marine Parade.

On 7 October 1834 Freshfield married Elizabeth Sims Stephenson (1812–1849), only daughter of Daniel Stephenson, an Elder Brother of Trinity House. They had six children, but all but two daughters died young. Elizabeth also died early in 1849. His brothers John and Henry Freshfield were also active in the family legal firm. He was uncle to Douglas Freshfield, the travel writer, and cousin to Edmund Blacket, the Australian architect.

== Legacy ==
When house-building began in the nearby Park Road East in Brighton in 1880–82, the road was renamed Freshfield Road in his honour. Three other streets in Brighton bear his name. Among his later Brighton homes was 9 Eastern Terrace, later to be briefly the home of King Manuel II of Portugal and in 2004 the most expensive house in the city.

Parliament of the United Kingdom
Preceded by William Nicol; Alexander George Dickson	Member for Dover; 1865 – 1868; With: Alexander George Dickson	Succeeded by George Jessel; Alexander George Dickson
Preceded by Edward William Barnett; Alexander George Dickson	Member of Parliament for Dover; 1874 – 1885; With: Alexander George Dickson	Succeeded by Alexander George Dickson
