= Clark baronets of Cavendish Square (1883) =

Escutcheon of the Clark baronets of Cavendish Square

The Clark baronetcy, of Cavendish Square, London, was created in the Baronetage of the United Kingdom on 9 August 1883 for Andrew Clark, in recognition of his services to medical science. The title became extinct on the death of the 3rd Baronet, a Queen's Counsel, in 1979.

== Clark baronets, of Cavendish Square (1883) ==
- Sir Andrew Clark, 1st Baronet (1826–1893)
- Sir James Richardson Andrew Clark, 2nd Baronet (1852–1948)
- Sir Andrew Edmund James Clark, 3rd Baronet (1898–1979)

== Notes ==
Baronetage of the United Kingdom
Preceded by Hewett baronets	Clark baronets of Cavendish Square; 9 August 1883	Succeeded by Farrer baronets
