= Francis L'Estrange Joseph =

British industrialist

Sir Francis Joseph Bt
- Born: 1870; Liverpool, England
- Died: 8 February 1951, aged 81; Cheshire, England
- Occupation: Businessman

Sir Francis L'Estrange Joseph, 1st Baronet, KBE, DL, JP (1870 – 8 February 1951) was a leading British industrialist and president of the Federation of British Industries.

== Early life ==
Joseph was born in 1870 in Liverpool, the younger son of Thomas Joseph. Educated at Caledonian School in Liverpool until he was 12 when he left to become a railway messenger, although he continued to attend evening classes. After a number of varied jobs he became a stockbroker, Joseph joined Settle, Speakman & Company and became the chairman and managing director.

== Politics and business ==
He became a member of Liverpool City Council in 1903 until 1913. At the General Election in January 1910 he stood for Liverpool Walton as a Liberal against the incumbent F.E. Smith. Despite a record Liberal vote he failed to beat Smith. During the First World War he worked at the War Office becoming an assistant secretary at the Ministry of National Service. In 1918 he was Deputy Director-General of National Labour Supply.

In 1918 Joseph unsuccessfully stood for Parliament in the new constituency of Liverpool Fairfield for the Coalition Liberals. Joseph was appointed a Commander of the Order of the British Empire (CBE) in 1918 and in 1922 he was knighted. He was a director of many public companies including the Midland Bank and from 1937 to 1940 was a member of the Royal Commission on the Location of Industry. He was appointed the High Sheriff of Staffordshire for 1932. Joseph was promoted to Knight Commander of the Order of the British Empire in 1935 and created a baronet in 1942.

== Family ==
Joseph married in 1917 to Violet Settle and they had two daughters. Joseph died on 8 February 1951 and with no sons the baronetcy became dormant.

== Arms ==
Coat of arms of Francis L'Estrange Joseph

Crest
A rock in flames Proper.
Escutcheon
Or a griffin segreant Sable on a chief indented of the second a trefoil slipped between two garbs of the field.
Motto
Truth Is Light

Baronetage of the United Kingdom
New creation	Baronet (of Stoke-on-Trent); 1942–1951	Extinct
