= Edward Jessel, 2nd Baron Jessel =

British politician

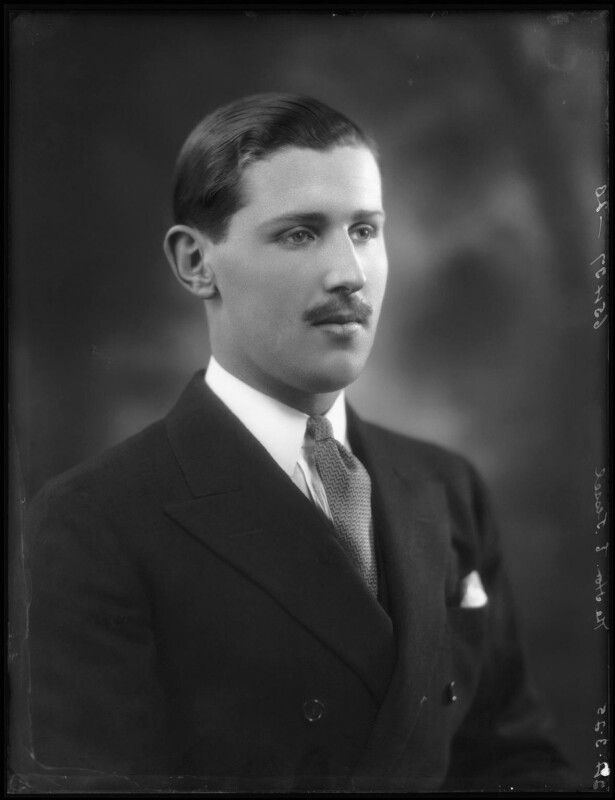
Jessel in 1925

Edward Herbert Jessel, 2nd Baron Jessel CBE (25 March 1904 – 13 June 1990), was a British politician.

Jessel was the only son of Herbert Jessel, 1st Baron Jessel, by Maud Goldsmid, daughter of Sir Julian Goldsmid, 3rd Baronet. He was educated at Eton and Christ Church, Oxford, and was called to the Bar, Inner Temple. He succeeded his father in the barony in 1950. He was Chairman of the Association of Independent Unionist Peers from 1959 to 1964 and a Deputy Speaker of the House of Lords from 1963 to 1977. In 1963 he was appointed a Commander of the Order of the British Empire.

Lord Jessel married Lady Helen Maglona Vane-Tempest-Stewart (1911-1986), daughter of Charles Stewart Henry Vane-Tempest-Stewart, 7th Marquess of Londonderry and the Honourable Edith Chaplin, in 1935. They had one son and two daughters but were divorced in 1960. Jessel married as his second wife Jessica Marian Taylor, daughter of H. Taylor, in 1960. There were no children from this marriage. His only son by his first wife, the Honourable Timothy Edward Jessel (1935–1969), predeceased him, leaving a daughter. Lord Jessel died in June 1990, aged 86, when the barony became extinct.

Peerage of the United Kingdom
Preceded by Herbert Merton Jessel	Baron Jessel; 1950–1990	Extinct
