= Frank Lampl =

Czech-British businessman (1926 – 2011)

Sir Frank William Lampl (6 April 1926 – 23 March 2011) was a Czech-born British businessman. He led the British building firm Bovis during a 15-year period as Chairman and Chief Executive Officer.

== Career ==
Lampl was born in Brno, Czechoslovakia, into a cultured Jewish land-owning family. He was the son of prominent Austrian lawyer Otto Lampl (1887–1934) and his wife, Olga Jelinek Lamplová. His mother was murdered in Auschwitz in 1944. Lampl and his sister Anda were the only members of his immediate family to survive the war. He spent his teenage years as a prisoner in the Theresienstadt Ghetto and Auschwitz and Dachau Nazi concentration camps, and his first construction job was as a slave labourer on an underground camp in Kaufering auxiliary camp of Dachau.

After World War II, Lampl resumed his studies in Brno and inherited property from his murdered family. But after the communist takeover he was denounced as a bourgeois undesirable and sentenced to imprisonment in the uranium mines of Jáchymov. He married Blanka Kratochvílová, and they had one son.

Lampl benefited from a general amnesty on Stalin's birthday and was released in 1953 on condition that he take up work in either mining or construction. Having tired of mining he returned to construction. By 1963 he was managing director of the "Pozemní stavby závod Opava" state construction company and won a place at Brno University.

Unwilling to be caught by a third oppressive regime when the Russian tanks rolled into Prague in 1968, Frank Lampl and his wife left with one suitcase to visit their son Thomas who was studying at Oxford University in England. They never returned and at the age of 42, he began his career in construction again. He joined the British building firm Bovis in 1971 and, by 1975, led Bovis's first foray overseas enjoying particular success in the Middle East.

In 1978, Lampl became chief executive of Bovis International and further contract successes followed, an achievement crowned by the Queen's Award for Export in 1984 and 1986. Bovis had been a division of the diversified transport and shipping company P&O since 1974, and, in 1985, Lampl joined the P&O main board in his capacity as Chairman of Bovis.

Bovis became a name synonymous with the Big Bang building boom of London in the 1980s and the company’s introduction of US construction management skills facilitated rapid completion of the most complicated projects. The biggest was Canary Wharf with the tallest building in Europe.

At the same time, Lampl realised that Bovis needed to diversify internationally if the company was to survive after the boom was over. By 1990 Bovis had completed three substantial acquisitions in the US and in 1991 was able to win the 1996 Summer Olympics construction management contract.

There were a highly successful series of acquisitions on the continent of Europe bringing major projects and Bovis also won EuroDisney outside Paris, finished in 1992, and a huge shopping centre under Red Square in Moscow.

Additionally, Lampl set up an operation in his hometown of Brno, and Bovis participated in several major Czech developments. And the Asian expansion of Bovis resulted in some notable wins, particularly the Petronas Towers in Kuala Lumpur, then the tallest building in the world.

In 1999, Lampl oversaw the successful sale of Bovis to Lendlease and then announced his retirement as chairman in July 2000, becoming the president.

Lampl was well known in Israel and lived with his second wife, artist Wenda, dividing his time between his home in Wiltshire, London's striking new Chelsea Bridge Wharf development and Washington, D.C.

He was knighted in the 1990 New Year Honours and was an ex-chancellor of Kingston University as well as a holder of numerous honorary degrees.
