= Dan Samuel, 4th Viscount Samuel =

British-Israeli businessman and peer (1925–2014)

Dan Judah Samuel, 4th Viscount Samuel (25 March 1925 – 7 November 2014) was a British-Israeli businessman and peer.

== Biography ==
Samuel was the son of Hadassah Goor and Edwin Samuel, 2nd Viscount Samuel, the grandson of the British-Jewish diplomat Herbert Samuel, 1st Viscount Samuel, and the younger brother of David Samuel, 3rd Viscount Samuel. He was a second cousin of chemist Rosalind Franklin. He fought in the Second World War, before fighting for Israel in 1948. He was a senior executive for the Royal Dutch Shell group for more than 30 years. From 1957 until 1977 he was married to Esther "Nonni" Gordon, who is from Johannesburg, South Africa. They had three children, including the 5th Viscount, Jonathan Herbert Samuel. Samuel later married Heather Cumming in 1981. They divorced in 1992.

=== Peerage ===
Samuel only held the viscountcy for one month, after his brother had died on 7 October 2014. The 4th Viscount Samuel then died in Westport, Connecticut, on 7 November 2014 at the age of 89.

Peerage of the United Kingdom
Preceded by David Samuel	Viscount Samuel; October 2014 – November 2014	Succeeded by Jonathan Samuel
