= Solomon de Medina =

First Jew to be knighted in England (c. 1650–1730)

Sir Solomon de Medina (ca.1650, Bordeaux – 15 September 1730, Amsterdam) was an army contractor for William III and the first Jew to be knighted in England.

== Career ==
Solomon de Medina was a wealthy Jew who went with William III to England as an army contractor. In 1702, he returned to Amsterdam, from which point his son-in-law acted for him in London. He attained notability due to his extensive dealings with the English government of his day. "The Jew Medina," as he was popularly called, held a position of prominence in connection with the English forces. During the War of the Spanish Succession (1702–14), he accompanied John Churchill, 1st Duke of Marlborough on his campaigns, advanced him funds, and furnished provisions for the troops.

He also established a system of expresses which outstripped those of the government, so that his agents were in possession of important news before it reached the ministers of the Crown. His negotiations were made evident in an attack on the Duke of Marlborough in Parliament in 1711 for giving Medina a yearly payment of £6,000. Marlborough replied that the money had been expended in obtaining trustworthy information. It was said of Medina that every British victory contributed as much to his wealth as to the glory of England.

For his services, he was knighted in 1700, the first Jew in England to receive that honour. Sir Solomon de Medina was at one time the largest contributor to the Bevis Marks Synagogue in London.

== Sources ==
- Dictionary of National Biography
- Oxford Dictionary of National Biography
