= St Pancras South =

Parliamentary constituency in the United Kingdom, 1885–1918

- Former borough constituency for the House of Commons

1885–1918
- Seats: One
- Created from: Marylebone
- Replaced by: St Pancras South East and St Pancras South West

St. Pancras South was a borough constituency represented in the House of Commons of the Parliament of the United Kingdom. It elected one Member of Parliament (MP) by the first-past-the-post system of election. It was created by the Redistribution of Seats Act 1885 for the 1885 general election and abolished for the 1918 general election.

== Boundaries ==
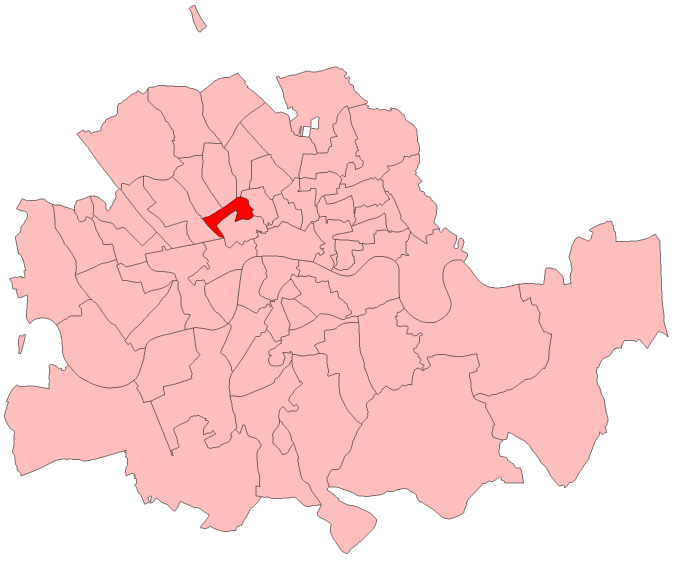
St Pancras South in the Metropolitan area, boundaries 1885-1918

== Members of Parliament ==
| Election | Member | Party |
|---|---|---|
| 1885 | Sir Julian Goldsmid | Liberal |
| 1886 | Sir Julian Goldsmid | Liberal Unionist |
| 1896 b-e | Herbert Jessel | Liberal Unionist |
| 1906 | Philip Whitwell Wilson | Liberal |
| Jan. 1910 | Herbert Jessel | Liberal Unionist |
| 1918 | constituency abolished | |

== Elections ==
=== Elections in the 1880s ===
General election 1885: St Pancras South
| Party | Candidate | Votes | % | ±% |
|---|---|---|---|---|
| Liberal | Julian Goldsmid | 2,225 | 52.6 | |
| Conservative | John Blundell Maple | 2,003 | 47.4 | |
| Majority | | 222 | 5.2 | |
| Turnout | | 4,228 | 78.9 | |
| Registered electors | | 5,357 | | |
| Liberal win (new seat) | | | | |

General election 1886: St Pancras South
| Party | Candidate | Votes | % | ±% |
|---|---|---|---|---|
| Liberal Unionist | Julian Goldsmid | 1,915 | 68.1 | +20.7 |
| Liberal | Edward John Beale | 897 | 31.9 | −20.7 |
| Majority | | 1,018 | 36.2 | N/A |
| Turnout | | 2,812 | 52.5 | −26.4 |
| Registered electors | | 5,357 | | |
| Liberal Unionist gain from Liberal | | Swing | +20.7 | |

=== Elections in the 1890s ===
General election 1892: St Pancras South
| Party | Candidate | Votes | % | ±% |
|---|---|---|---|---|
| Liberal Unionist | Julian Goldsmid | 2,470 | 54.9 | −13.2 |
| Liberal | Edward John Beale | 2,033 | 45.1 | +13.2 |
| Majority | | 437 | 9.8 | −26.4 |
| Turnout | | 4,503 | 73.7 | +21.2 |
| Registered electors | | 6,106 | | |
| Liberal Unionist hold | | Swing | −13.2 | |

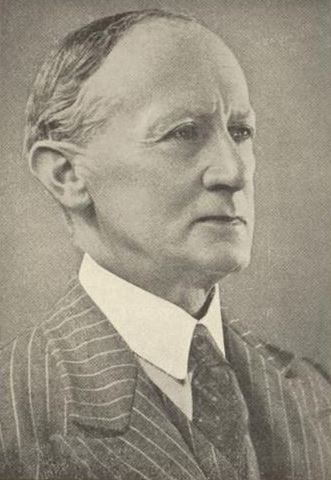
George Montagu Harris

General election 1895: St Pancras South
| Party | Candidate | Votes | % | ±% |
|---|---|---|---|---|
| Liberal Unionist | Julian Goldsmid | 2,433 | 66.5 | +11.6 |
| Liberal | George Montagu Harris | 1,223 | 33.5 | −11.6 |
| Majority | | 1,210 | 33.0 | +23.2 |
| Turnout | | 3,656 | 66.0 | −7.7 |
| Registered electors | | 5,542 | | |
| Liberal Unionist hold | | Swing | +11.6 | |

Goldsmid's death prompted a by-election.

1896 St Pancras South by-election
| Party | Candidate | Votes | % | ±% |
|---|---|---|---|---|
| Liberal Unionist | Herbert Jessel | 2,631 | 65.7 | −0.8 |
| Liberal | George Montagu Harris | 1,375 | 34.3 | +0.8 |
| Majority | | 1,256 | 31.4 | −1.6 |
| Turnout | | 4,006 | 72.3 | +6.3 |
| Registered electors | | 5,544 | | |
| Liberal Unionist hold | | Swing | −0.8 | |

=== Elections in the 1900s ===
General election 1900: St Pancras South
| Party | Candidate | Votes | % | ±% |
|---|---|---|---|---|
| Liberal Unionist | Herbert Jessel | 2,273 | 67.1 | +0.6 |
| Liberal | Norman Philip Hamilton | 1,113 | 32.9 | −0.6 |
| Majority | | 1,160 | 34.2 | +1.2 |
| Turnout | | 3,386 | 57.4 | −8.6 |
| Registered electors | | 5,894 | | |
| Liberal Unionist hold | | Swing | +0.6 | |

Philip Whitwell Wilson

General election 1906: St Pancras South
| Party | Candidate | Votes | % | ±% |
|---|---|---|---|---|
| Liberal | Philip Whitwell Wilson | 2,109 | 50.7 | +17.8 |
| Liberal Unionist | Herbert Jessel | 2,048 | 49.3 | −17.8 |
| Majority | | 61 | 1.4 | N/A |
| Turnout | | 4,157 | 78.0 | +20.6 |
| Registered electors | | 5,329 | | |
| Liberal gain from Liberal Unionist | | Swing | +17.8 | |

=== Elections in the 1910s ===
General election January 1910: St Pancras South
| Party | Candidate | Votes | % | ±% |
|---|---|---|---|---|
| Liberal Unionist | Herbert Jessel | 2,750 | 58.8 | +9.5 |
| Liberal | Philip Whitwell Wilson | 1,925 | 41.2 | −9.5 |
| Majority | | 825 | 17.6 | N/A |
| Turnout | | 4,675 | 84.4 | +6.4 |
| Registered electors | | 5,536 | | |
| Liberal Unionist gain from Liberal | | Swing | +9.5 | |

General election December 1910: St Pancras South
| Party | Candidate | Votes | % | ±% |
|---|---|---|---|---|
| Liberal Unionist | Herbert Jessel | 2,415 | 58.1 | −0.7 |
| Liberal | Florance Montefiore Guedalla | 1,744 | 41.9 | +0.7 |
| Majority | | 671 | 16.2 | −1.4 |
| Turnout | | 4,159 | 75.1 | −9.3 |
| Registered electors | | 5,536 | | |
| Liberal Unionist hold | | Swing | −0.7 | |

General Election 1914–15:

Another General Election was required to take place before the end of 1915. The political parties had been making preparations for an election to take place and by July 1914, the following candidates had been selected;

- Unionist: Herbert Jessel
- Liberal: Florance Montefiore Guedalla
