= David Samuel, 3rd Viscount Samuel =

Anglo-Israeli chemist & neurobiologist (1922-2014)

David Herbert Samuel 3rd Viscount Samuel OBE
- דוד הרברט סמואל
- Born: 8 July 1922
- Died: 7 October 2014 (aged 92)
- Education: Balliol College, Oxford
- Occupations: Academic scientist, writer
- Father: Edward Samuel
- Relatives: Herbert Samuel (paternal grandfather); Rosalind Franklin (2nd cousin)
- Military career
- Allegiance: United Kingdom
- Branch: British Army
- Service years: 1939–1945
- Rank: Captain
- Unit: Royal Artillery
- Conflicts: World War II; Burma campaign

David Herbert Samuel, 3rd Viscount Samuel OBE (Hebrew: דוד הרברט סמואל; 8 July 1922 – 7 October 2014) was an Anglo-Israeli chemist and neurobiologist.

Samuel was the son of Edwin Samuel, 2nd Viscount Samuel, and the grandson of the British-Jewish diplomat Herbert Samuel, 1st Viscount Samuel. He was a second cousin of Rosalind Franklin. He was educated at Balliol College, Oxford, and served in the Royal Artillery in the Second World War in India, Burma and Sumatra, reaching the rank of captain. He then commenced a distinguished academic career, and was one of the founding fathers of the faculty of chemistry at the Weizmann Institute of Science. Late in his career, his scientific interests moved from physical chemistry (particularly chemical kinetics) to neurobiology. He was the author of over 300 publications as well as the book Memory: How We Use It, Lose It and Can Improve It.

From 14 November 1978 until 11 November 1999 he was a member of the British House of Lords, although his only appearance in the official record, Hansard, was taking his oath in 1995. This made him the only Israeli who ever served in this capacity.

Peerage of the United Kingdom
Preceded by Edwin Herbert Samuel	Viscount Samuel; 1978–2014	Succeeded by Dan Judah Samuel
