= Edwin Samuel, 2nd Viscount Samuel =

British viscount (1898–1978)

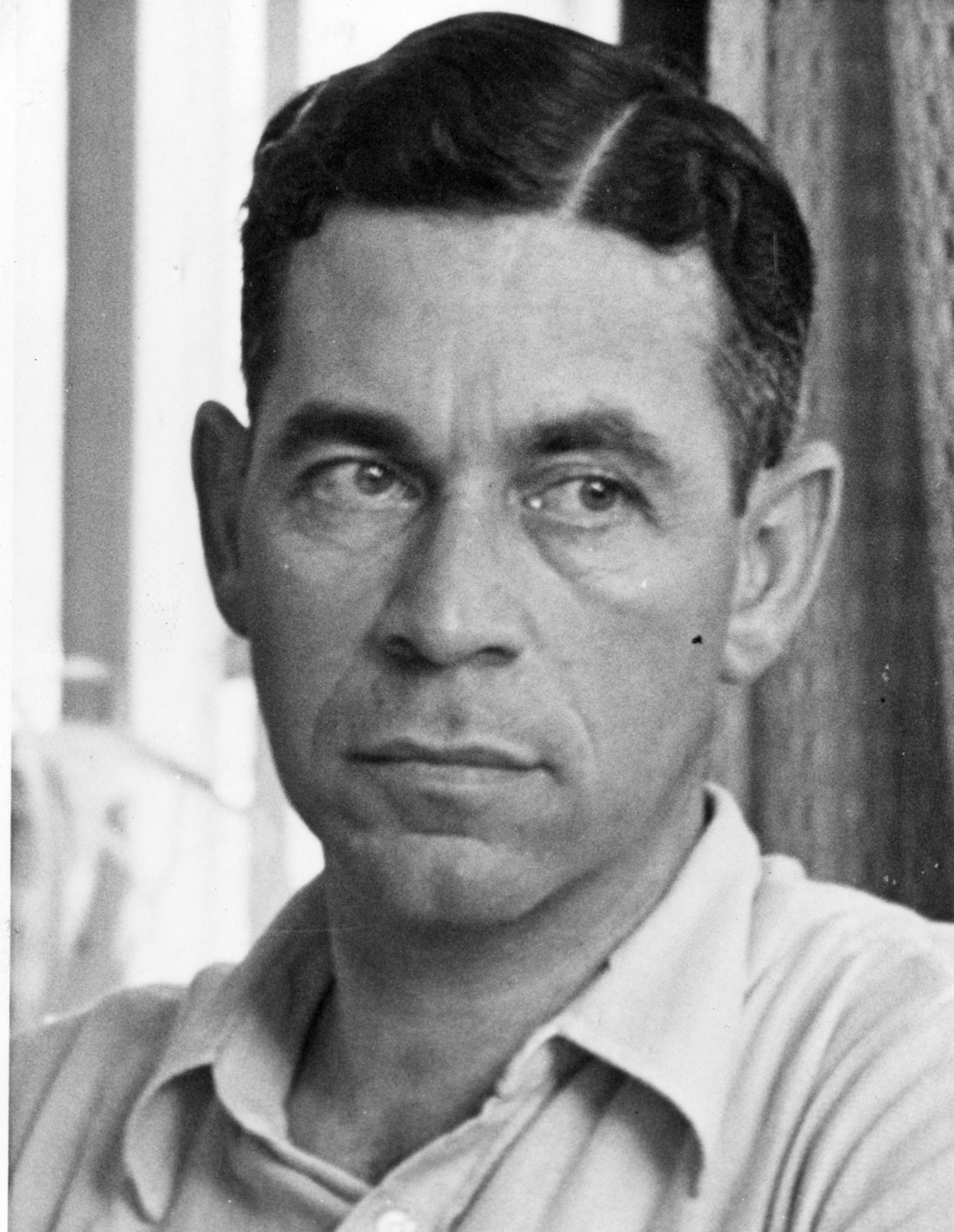
Edwin Samuel, 1945

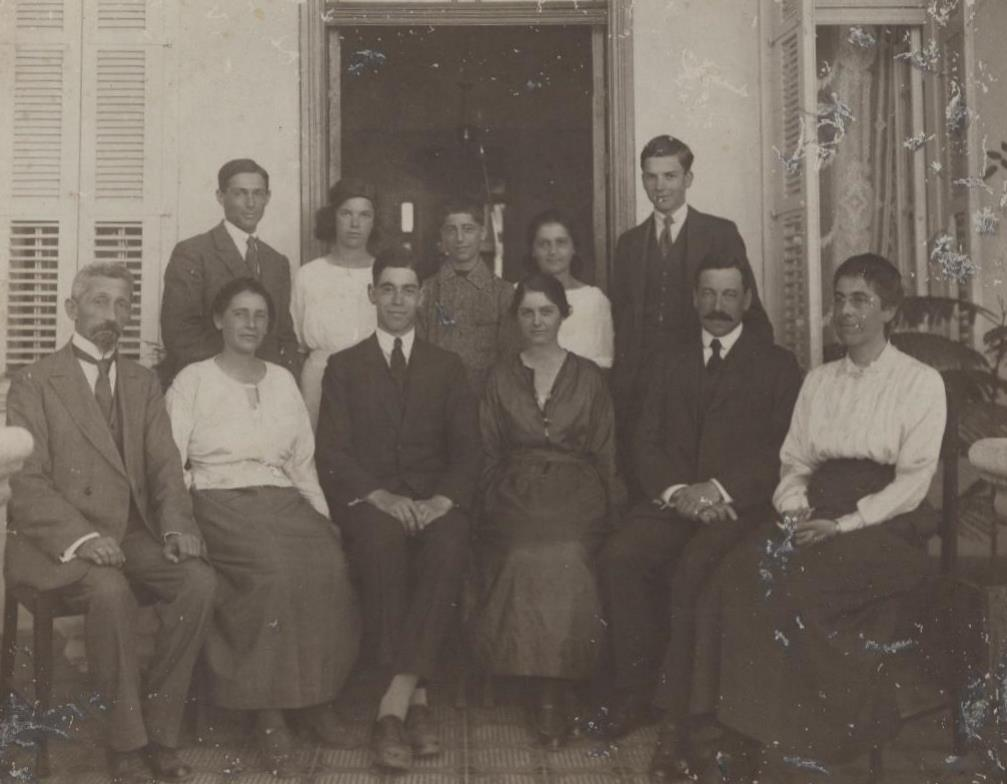
Hadassa and Edwin Samuel in a family picture with Herbert Samuel

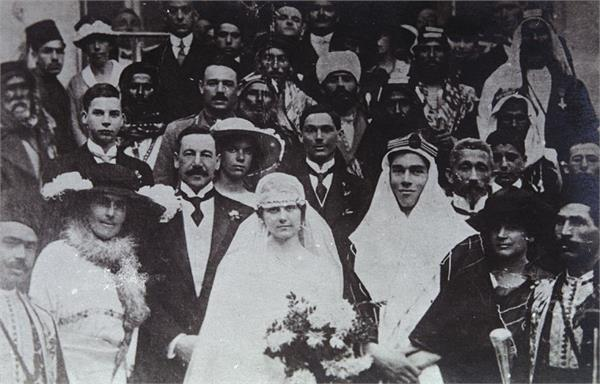
The wedding of Edwin Samuel & Yehudit Grazovsky/Gur (Hadassa) 1920

Edwin Herbert Samuel, 2nd Viscount Samuel GCB (Hebrew: אדווין הרברט סמואל; 11 September 1898 – 14 November 1978), was a British lord, also active in Mandatory Palestine and the State of Israel.

The son of Beatrice Franklin and Herbert Samuel – Palestine's first high commissioner – he was the father of Professor David Samuel and Dan Samuel.

Samuel was educated at Westminster School and Balliol College, Oxford. In the spring of 1917 he joined the Royal Artillery and was posted to the Egyptian Expeditionary Force. He also served in the Jewish Legion. After the First World War he joined the Mandatory Government in Palestine, and was the last mandate-era director of the Palestine Broadcasting Service.

As a viscount, he served as a peer in the House of Lords. One of his significant acts was to have the law that forbade marriage between a woman and her brother-in-law repealed. His explicit intent was to allow a man to fulfil his responsibility under the Judaic Biblical law of levirate marriage, as described in the Book of Deuteronomy, whereby the brother of a man who dies childless must marry the widow.

Lord Samuel was the initiator of the Knesset Menorah project which eventually led to the huge bronze candelabrum presented by the British parliament to the State of Israel in 1956.

Peerage of the United Kingdom
Preceded by Herbert Samuel	Viscount Samuel; 1963–1978	Succeeded by David Samuel
