= Sir Samuel Joseph, 1st Baronet =

Sir Samuel Joseph Bt
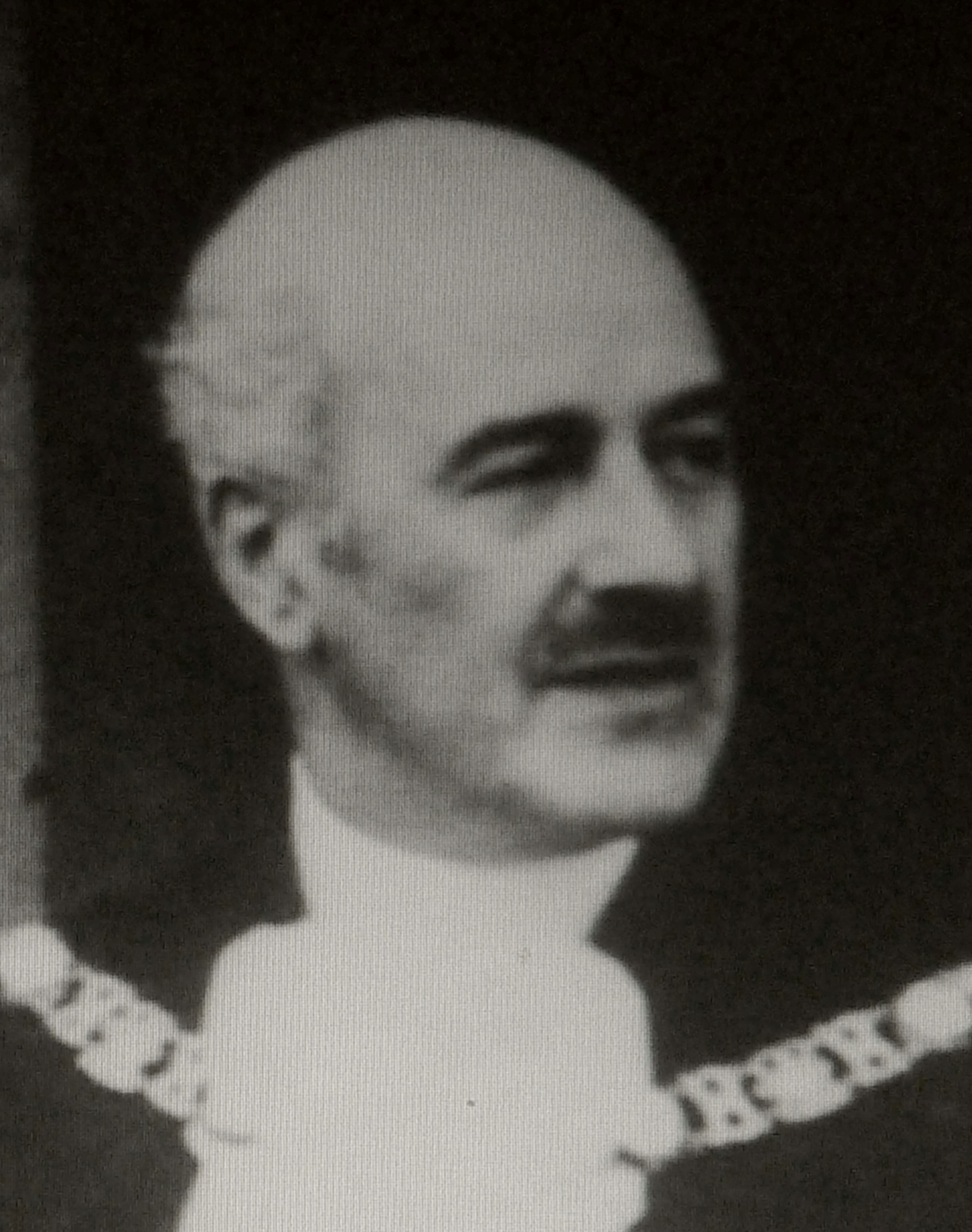
- Sir Samuel Joseph, c. 1943
- Born: Samuel George Joseph; 15 August 1888
- Died: 4 October 1944 (aged 56)
- Known for: 615th Lord Mayor of London
- Children: Keith Joseph (son)
- Relatives: Samuel Gluckstein (1821-1873) (father-in-law); Sir Samuel Gluckstein (son-in-law)

Sir Samuel George Joseph, 1st Baronet (15 August 1888 – 4 October 1944) was the 615th Lord Mayor of London.

== Early life ==
Samuel George Joseph was born on 15 August 1888, the son of Abraham Joseph and his wife Sarah (Gluckstein), the daughter of Samuel Gluckstein, the founder of Salmon & Gluckstein tobacco merchants.

== Career ==
Samuel Joseph made a name for himself when in 1908, together with his cousin, Sydney Gluckstein, he acquired C. W. Bovis & Co., then a local builder, and expanded it into a major construction business. It was said that he was a 'genius for organisation'.

During World War I, Samuel Joseph went off to France to fight in the British Army, as a captain in the Royal Irish Regiment. On his return he personally supervised a building development at Sussex Square in London for Winston Churchill.

He later became an underwriter for Lloyd's of London and an Alderman of the City of London. He served as Sheriff of London for 1933, for which he was knighted in 1934, and Lord Mayor of London for 1942 to 1943. He became a baronet at the end of his term as Lord Mayor on 16 November 1943. He died in 1944 aged 56.

== Family ==
He was married to Edna Cicely (Phillips). Their son, Keith Joseph, went on to be a Cabinet Minister.

In 1909, his daughter Julia married Sir Samuel Gluckstein, solicitor and politician.

Political offices
Preceded by Sir John Laurie, 1st Baronet	Lord Mayor of London; 1942–1943	Succeeded by Frank Newson-Smith
Baronetage of the United Kingdom
New creation	Baronet (of Portsoken); 1943–1944	Succeeded by Keith Joseph
