= Herbert Jessel, 1st Baron Jessel =

British politician

Colonel Herbert Merton Jessel, 1st Baron Jessel CB, CMG, TD, DL, JP (27 October 1866 – 1 November 1950), known as Sir Herbert Jessel, Bt, between 1917 and 1924, was a British soldier and Liberal Unionist, later Conservative politician.

== Biography ==
Jessel was the younger son of Sir George Jessel, Solicitor-General and Master of the Rolls, by Amelia Moses, daughter of Joseph Moses. Sir Charles Jessel, 1st Baronet, of Ladham House, was his elder brother (see Jessel Baronets). He was educated at Rugby and New College, Oxford.

He was commissioned into the 17th Lancers on 19 November 1886 and retired with the rank of captain on 25 March 1896, but volunteered to serve in the Second Boer War as a major in the Imperial Yeomanry. On 2 December 1905 he was appointed Honorary Colonel of the 1st Volunteer Battalion, Royal Fusiliers.

Jessel was a member of the Westminster City Council, representing Grosvenor Ward. He served as the third Mayor of Westminster in 1902–03.

Jessel was elected to Parliament as a Liberal Unionist for St Pancras South in an 1896 by-election (succeeding his deceased father-in-law Sir Julian Goldsmid). He lost his Parliamentary seat at the Liberal landslide at the 1906 general election but regained the seat as a Conservative in the January 1910 general election. The constituency was abolished in 1918 and Jessel never returned to the House of Commons. He was the Conservative candidate for the 1921 Westminster St George's by-election. He was created a Baronet, of Westminster, in 1917, made a Companion of the Order of St Michael and St George in 1918 and an officer of the Order of Leopold and Companion of the Order of the Bath in 1919. In 1924 he was elevated to the peerage as Baron Jessel, of Westminster in the County of London.

Lord Jessel married Maud Goldsmid, daughter of Sir Julian Goldsmid, 3rd Baronet, in 1894. They had several children. Lord Jessel died in November 1950, aged 84, and was succeeded by his only son, Edward. Lady Jessel died in October 1965.

Parliament of the United Kingdom
Preceded by Sir Julian Goldsmid, Bt	Member of Parliament for St Pancras South; 1896–1906	Succeeded by Philip Whitwell Wilson
Preceded by Philip Whitwell Wilson	Member of Parliament for St Pancras South; 1910–1918	Constituency abolished
Baronetage of the United Kingdom
New creation	Baronet (of Westminster); 1917–1950	Succeeded by Edward Herbert Jessel
Peerage of the United Kingdom
New creation	Baron Jessel; 1924–1950	Succeeded by Edward Herbert Jessel
