= Bovis (company) =

UK construction business

- Formerly: Lendlease Project Management & Construction; Bovis Lend Lease; C. W. Bovis & Co
- Type: Private
- Industry: Construction
- Founded: 1885
- Founder: Charles Bovis
- Headquarters: London, England
- Area served: United Kingdom
- Key people: David Cadiot
- Services: Construction; Project management
- Revenue: £291 million (2025)
- Net income: £56 million (2025)
- Number of employees: 830 (2025)
- Parent: Atlas Holdings
- Website: www.bovis.com

Bovis is a construction, project management and consulting business headquartered in London, with offices in Manchester and Birmingham. Founded in 1885, it built the Lloyd's Building and Trafford Centre. It became a subsidiary of P&O in 1974 and was acquired by Lendlease in 1999, trading as Bovis Lend Lease until 2011. Acquired under Atlas Holdings in 2025, it rose from outside the top 50 UK contractors to fifth within a year, winning nearly £1.4 billion of orders, with industry analyst Glenigan describing it as one of the most famous names in UK construction.

== History ==
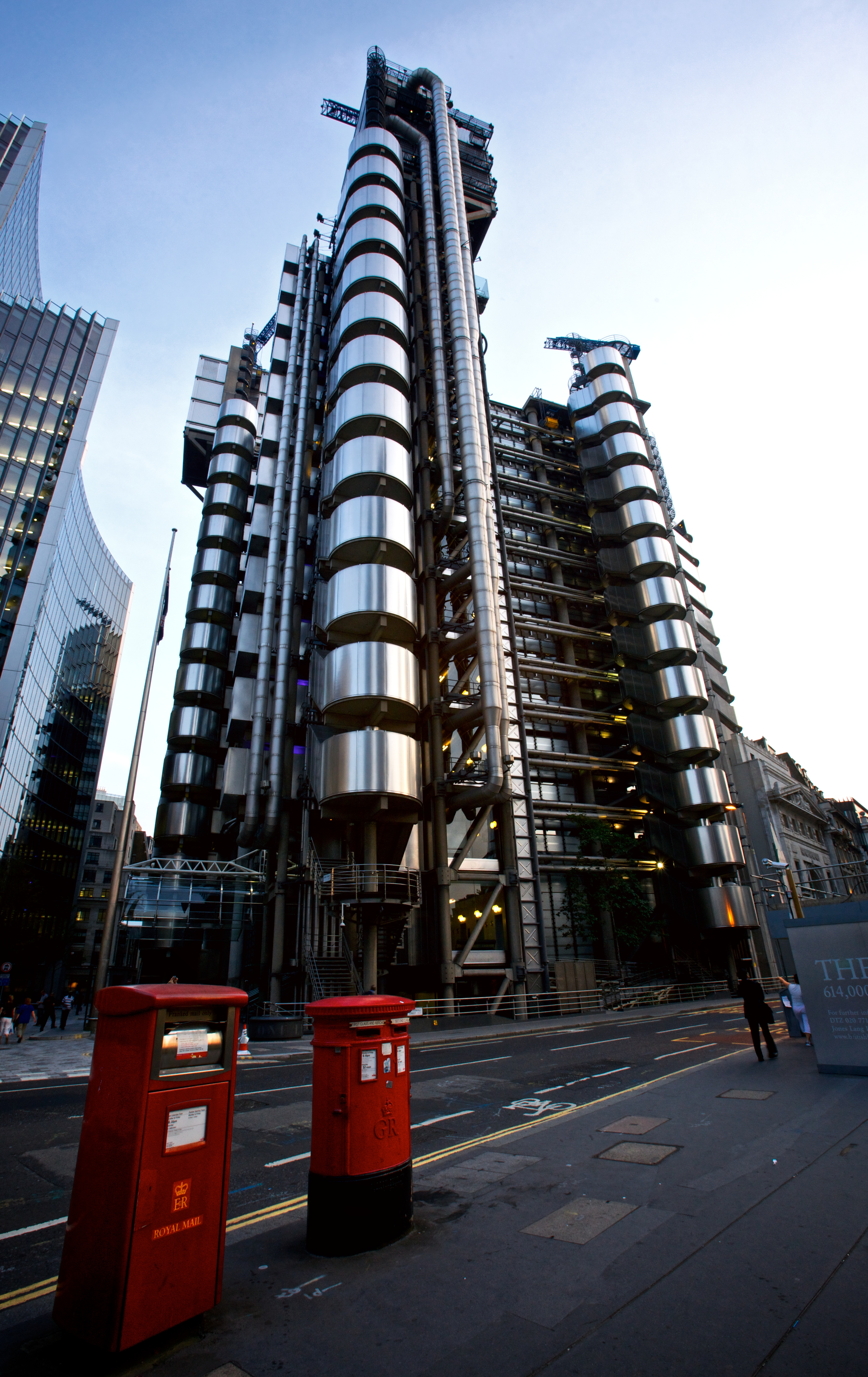
The Lloyd's Building in London, which was completed in 1986.

=== 1885–2011 ===
Bovis Construction was founded as C. W. Bovis & Co by Charles Bovis in London in 1885. In 1908 it was acquired by Samuel Joseph and his cousin, Sidney Gluckstein.

Bovis was one of the few construction companies to go public in the 1920s, during which time it developed an extensive retail clientele, by far the most important and long lasting of which was Marks & Spencer. Central to the relationship with Marks & Spencer was the pioneering Bovis System contract, designed to bring the interests of the contractor and client together. The Bovis System paid the builder the prime cost of the work plus an agreed fee to cover overheads and profit. The client received any savings during construction instead of the contractor.

During World War II, Bovis' activities were dominated by the British war efforts; amongst other projects, it constructed the munitions factory at Swynnerton and worked on Mulberry harbour units. At the end of the war, Bovis resumed its work in the private sector. In the early 1950s, the company moved into house construction. Following the acquisition of Frank Sanderson's business in 1967, Bovis Homes expanded rapidly and became one of the largest housebuilders by the early 1970s.

Frank Sanderson was to change radically the future of Bovis. He was appointed managing director of Bovis Holdings in January 1970, and chairman and chief executive in August 1972. After a number of acquisitions within the housing sector, Sanderson attempted to obtain control of P&O by means of a reverse takeover. An initial agreement was followed by a boardroom and shareholder rebellion at P&O which led to the merger effort failing in late 1972. Boardroom dissension broke out at Bovis, forcing Sanderson out in September 1973.

In 1971, Bovis acquired Twentieth Century Banking. Two years later, the secondary banking crisis broke out, resulting in a run on deposits at the Bovis banking subsidiary. The crisis came to a head in December 1973 when National Westminster Bank refused to provide the necessary funds. P&O stepped in and purchased Bovis in March 1974. Bovis, which had been valued at £160 million two years prior, was taken over for £25 million.

From 1985, the company was led by Frank Lampl; who was credited with its transformation from a British-centric concern into an international contractor. As a part of these change, it acquired the United States contractor McDevitt & Street in September 1990. Further acquisitions occurred during the 1990s. The company also pursued opportunities in the Asian market, becoming one of only five international contractors licensed to work in South Korea.

In 1997, Bovis Homes was spun off and floated on the London Stock Exchange. Around this time, Bovis was often regarded as the largest construction company in Britain, although this position was hotly contested by competing firms. One such competitor was Mace, which was founded and initially led by a former Bovis employee.

After discussing a sale to Hochtief and selling via a stock exchange listing, in October 1999 a £285 million offer from Lendlease was accepted. Bovis merged with Civil & Civic and was rebranded as Bovis Lend Lease. Senior figures, including Lampl, retained key positions within the business. In 2011, Bovis was rebranded Lendlease Project Management & Construction.

=== 2025–present ===
In March 2025, the brand was revived by Atlas Holdings after it purchased Lendlease's UK construction business.

Prior to the Atlas acquisition, Lendlease Construction (Europe) Limited had incurred a £16m loss on revenue of £471m in the year to 30 June 2024. CEO David Cadiot said profit was adversely impacted by provisions made against historic contracts. The business had a pipeline of secured and preferred bidder projects of £2.8 billion at the year end, including a commercial building in Manchester for Landsec and Crystal Palace Football Club's new stand at Selhurst Park.

In the nine months to 31 March 2025, Bovis posted a £56m pre-tax profit on revenue of £291m. The company's improved financial position was due to one-off accounting gains linked to the sale to Atlas. Headcount stood at 830 staff, down from 930.

== Major projects ==
Major projects involving Bovis, including those delivered while it traded as Bovis Lend Lease and Lendlease, have included:

- The Lloyd's Building (1986)
- Meadowhall Shopping Centre (1990)
- Broadgate (1991)
- The first phase of Canary Wharf (1991)
- The Trafford Centre (1998)
- Bluewater Shopping Centre (1999)
- The Scottish Parliament Building (2004)
- The Broadgate Tower (2008)
- 125 Old Broad Street (2008)
- Manchester Royal Infirmary (2009)
- The London 2012 Athletes' Village (2012)
- New Court, headquarters of Rothschild & Co (2011)
- Broadcasting House (2013)
- 8 Bishopsgate (2023)
- Platform 37, Google's UK headquarters at King's Cross (2026)
- Universal United Kingdom (due to be completed in 2031)
