= Keith Joseph =

British politician (1918–1994)

The Right Honourable The Lord Joseph CH PC
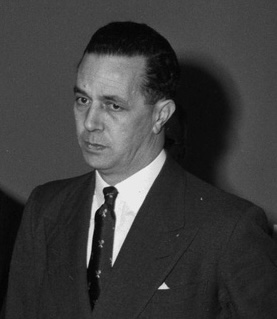
- Joseph in 1963

Secretary of State for Education and Science
- In office 11 September 1981 – 21 May 1986
- Prime Minister: Margaret Thatcher
- Preceded by: Mark Carlisle
- Succeeded by: Kenneth Baker

Secretary of State for Industry
- In office 4 May 1979 – 11 September 1981
- Prime Minister: Margaret Thatcher
- Preceded by: Eric Varley
- Succeeded by: Patrick Jenkin

Secretary of State for Social Services
- In office 20 June 1970 – 4 March 1974
- Prime Minister: Edward Heath
- Preceded by: Richard Crossman
- Succeeded by: Barbara Castle
Junior ministerial offices
Minister for Housing and Local Government
In office 13 July 1962 – 16 October 1964
Prime Minister	Harold Macmillan; Alec Douglas-Home
Preceded by	Charles Hill
Succeeded by	Richard Crossman
Minister of State for Trade
In office 9 October 1961 – 13 July 1962
Prime Minister	Harold Macmillan
Preceded by	Frederick Erroll
Succeeded by	Alan Green
Parliamentary Secretary to the Ministry of Housing and Local Government
In office 22 October 1959 – 9 October 1961
Prime Minister	Harold Macmillan
Preceded by	Reginald Bevins
Succeeded by	George Jellicoe
Shadow Cabinet offices
Shadow Secretary of State for Industry
In office 28 February 1977 – 4 May 1979
Leader	Margaret Thatcher
Preceded by	John Biffen
Succeeded by	Eric Varley
Shadow Home Secretary
In office 13 June 1974 – 11 February 1975
Leader	Edward Heath
Preceded by	Jim Prior
Succeeded by	Ian Gilmour
Shadow Secretary of State for Social Services
In office 4 March 1974 – 12 March 1974
Leader	Edward Heath
Preceded by	John Silkin
Succeeded by	Geoffrey Howe
Shadow President of the Board of Trade Shadow Secretary of State for Trade
In office 23 February 1967 – 20 June 1970
Leader	Edward Heath
Preceded by	Anthony Barber
Succeeded by	Roy Mason
Shadow Minister for Power
In office 23 February 1967 – 11 October 1967
Leader	Edward Heath
Preceded by	Anthony Barber
Succeeded by	Margaret Thatcher
Shadow Minister for Labour
In office 4 August 1965 – 23 February 1967
Leader	Edward Heath
Preceded by	Joseph Godber
Succeeded by	Robert Carr
Shadow Minister for Social Services
In office 29 October 1964 – 20 April 1966
Leader	Alec Douglas-Home; Edward Heath
Preceded by	Bernard Braine
Succeeded by	Mervyn Pike
Shadow Minister for Housing and Local Government
In office 16 October 1964 – 29 October 1964
Leader	Alec Douglas-Home
Preceded by	Michael Stewart
Succeeded by	John Boyd-Carpenter
Parliamentary offices
Member of the House of Lords Lord Temporal
In office 12 October 1987 – 10 December 1994; Life peerage
Member of Parliament for Leeds North East
In office 9 February 1956 – 18 May 1987
Preceded by	Osbert Peake
Succeeded by	Timothy Kirkhope

Personal details
- Born: Keith Sinjohn Joseph; 17 January 1918 London, England
- Died: 10 December 1994 (aged 76) London, England
- Party: Conservative
- Spouses: Hellen Guggenheimer (m. 1951; div. 1985) Yolanda Castro Sheriff (m. 1990)
- Parent: Sir Samuel Joseph, 1st Baronet (father)
- Education: Magdalen College, Oxford

Military service
- Allegiance: United Kingdom
- Branch/service: British Army
- Rank: Captain
- Unit: Royal Artillery
- Battles/wars: World War II

Keith Sinjohn Joseph, Baron Joseph, Bt, CH, PC (17 January 1918 – 10 December 1994), known as Sir Keith Joseph, 2nd Baronet, for most of his political life, was a British politician. A member of the Conservative Party, he served as a minister under four prime ministers: Harold Macmillan, Alec Douglas-Home, Edward Heath, and Margaret Thatcher. He was a key influence in the creation of what came to be known as Thatcherism.

Joseph introduced the concept of the social market economy into Britain, an economic and social system inspired by Christian democracy. He also co-founded the Centre for Policy Studies writing its first publication: Why Britain needs a Social Market Economy.

== Early life ==
Joseph was born in Westminster, London, to a wealthy and influential family, the son of Edna Cicely (Phillips) and Samuel Joseph. His father headed the vast family construction and project-management company, Bovis, and was Lord Mayor of London in 1942–3. At the end of his term he was created a baronet. Joseph's family was Jewish. On the death of his father on 4 October 1944, 26-year-old Keith inherited the baronetcy.

== Education and academic career ==
Joseph was educated at Lockers Park School in Hemel Hempstead in Hertfordshire, followed by Harrow School, where, uncharacteristically, he did not do particularly well academically. He then attended Magdalen College, Oxford, where he read jurisprudence, obtaining first class honours. He was elected a Prize Fellow of All Souls College, Oxford in 1946.

== Early career ==
During World War II, Joseph served as a captain in the Royal Artillery, and suffered a minor wound during German shelling of his company's headquarters in Italy, as well as being mentioned in dispatches. After the end of the war, he was called to the Bar (Middle Temple). Following his father, he was elected as an Alderman of the City of London. He was a Director of Bovis, becoming chairman in 1958, and became an underwriter at Lloyd's of London. In 1945, Joseph joined the leadership of the Post-War Orphans’ Committee of the Central British Fund for German Jewry (now World Jewish Relief).

== Member of Parliament ==
Joseph failed to be elected to the marginal seat of Barons Court in West London by 125 votes in the 1955 election. He was elected to parliament in a by-election for Leeds North East in February 1956. He was swiftly appointed as a Parliamentary Private Secretary.

=== In government ===
Following 1959, Joseph had several junior posts in the Macmillan government at the Ministry of Housing and the Board of Trade. In the 'Night of the Long Knives' reshuffle of 13 July 1962 he was made Minister for Housing and Local Government. He introduced a massive programme to build council housing, which aimed at 400,000 new homes per year by 1965. He wished to increase the proportion of owner-occupied households, by offering help with mortgage deposits. Housing was an important issue at the 1964 election and Joseph was felt to have done well on television in the campaign.

=== Social Services ===
In opposition, Joseph was spokesman on Social Services, and then on Labour under Edward Heath. He was one of twelve founder members of the National Council for the Single Woman and Her Dependants on 15 December 1965. According to Tim Cook's The History of the Carers' Movement, Joseph and Sally Oppenheim were critical in raising funds from the Carnegie Trust and other organisations, which enabled the carers movement to succeed and thrive through its formative years.

=== Trade spokesman ===
Despite Joseph's reputation as a right-winger, Heath promoted him to Trade spokesman in 1967, where he had an important role in policy development. In the run-up to the 1970 election Joseph made a series of speeches under the title "civilised capitalism", in which he outlined his political philosophy and hinted of cuts in public spending. At the Selsdon Park Hotel meeting, the Conservative Party largely adopted this approach.

After the Conservatives won the election, Joseph was made Secretary of State for Social Services, which put him in charge of the largest bureaucracy of any government department but kept him out of control of economics. Despite his speeches against bureaucracy, Joseph found himself compelled to add to it as he increased and improved services in the National Health Service. However, he grew increasingly opposed to the Heath government's economic strategy, which had seen a 'U-turn' in favour of intervention in industry in 1972.

Joseph’s largest intervention was a proposed major reform of the British pension system. Whilst the State Pension would have survived the reforms, Joseph instead planned for workers to contribute towards occupational schemes provided by employers (similar to Australian Superannuation). A ‘State Reserve’ scheme would have been set up for employees who were not enrolled in an occupational scheme, but critically without any prior funding, meaning a worker would only reach the maximum entitlement in 2019. State Reserve contributions would also not be subject to tax relief, reducing a worker's take home pay.

Although legislation was passed in the Social Security Act 1973, it was abolished by Labour under the Social Security Pensions Act 1975. Graduated Retirement Benefit was still abolished in 1975, replaced by the SERPS scheme in 1978.

=== 1974 ===
Following the election defeat of February 1974, Joseph worked with Margaret Thatcher to set up the Centre for Policy Studies, a think-tank to develop policies for the new free-market Conservatism that they both favoured. Joseph became interested in the economic theory of monetarism as formulated by Milton Friedman and persuaded Thatcher to support it. Despite still being a member of Heath's Shadow Cabinet, Joseph was openly critical of his government's record. In 1976, Joseph delivered his famous Stockton lecture on the economy Monetarism Is Not Enough in which he sought to discredit previously dominant Keynesian economic strategies and contrasted wealth-producing sectors in an economy, such as the private sector, with the wealth-consuming sectors of the state sector and subsidised sectors. He contended that an economy begins to decline as its wealth-producing sector shrinks.

Many on the right wing of the Conservative Party looked to Joseph to challenge Heath for the leadership, but his chances declined following a controversial speech on 19 October 1974. It covered a variety of socially-conservative topics and drew on an article that had been written by Arthur Wynn and his wife and published by the Child Poverty Action Group. The notion of the "cycle of deprivation" holding down poor people was the basis of his speech. He linked it to current theories of the culture of poverty, especially to the chaotic lifestyle of the poorest people. However, he suggested that poor people should stop having so many children. In his highly publicised speech at Edgbaston, he reflected on the moral and spiritual state of Britain:

A high and rising proportion of children are being born to mothers least fitted to bring children into the world ... Some are of low intelligence, most of low educational attainment. They are unlikely to be able to give children the stable emotional background, the consistent combination of love and firmness ... They are producing problem children ... The balance of our human stock, is threatened.

The outrage, despite his repeated apologies, in reaction to his speech sharply undercut Joseph's campaign to replace Heath as party leader. The speech was not largely written by Jonathan Sumption (who later went on to become a Supreme Court judge in United Kingdom) though it has been erroneously suggested that this was the case.

=== Margaret Thatcher ===
Joseph withdrew from the contest against Heath and informed Margaret Thatcher, who responded "if you're not going to stand, I will, because someone who represents our viewpoint has to stand." He now became a major advisor. Thatcher later referred to Joseph as her closest political friend. His overnight conversion to free-market, small-government policies "had the force of a religious conversion". This conviction earned him the nickname the "Mad Monk", courtesy of Chris Patten, the then director of the Conservative Research Department. In 1975, Joseph said:

It was only in April 1974 that I was converted to Conservatism. (I had thought I was a Conservative but I now see that I was not really one at all.)

This remark expressed Joseph's sense of failure during multiple Conservative governments that had automatically followed the post-war consensus of a welfare state with strong labour unions. Their policies to stabilise the economy retained government control on industries and created an intricate system to control wages and dividends. In the eyes of Thatcher and Joseph, that pragmatic approach was contrary to the true "Conservative" ideology. As he had done a great deal to promote Thatcher, when she won the leadership in 1975, she determined to put him in a position that would facilitate a profound influence on Conservative Party policy.

In Thatcher's Shadow cabinet, Joseph wanted to be Shadow Chancellor of the Exchequer, but that was impossible since his notorious 1974 speech. Instead, he was given overall responsibility for Policy and Research. He had a large impact on the Conservative manifesto for the 1979 election, but frequently, a compromise had to be reached with Heath's more moderate supporters, such as Jim Prior. Thatcher named Joseph Secretary of State for Industry. He began to prepare the many nationalised industries for privatisation by bringing in private sector managers such as Ian MacGregor but was still forced to give large subsidies to those industries making losses.

=== Secretary of State for Education and Science ===
As Thatcher's Secretary of State for Education from 1981 he started the ball rolling for GCSEs, and the establishment of a national curriculum in England and Wales. Mark Carlisle, his predecessor in the Conservative government in 1979, had cancelled the plans of Shirley Williams, his second-last predecessor, to merge O Levels and CSEs, but he achieved that policy. Although that was not normally the responsibility of central government, he insisted on personally approving the individual subject syllabuses before the GCSE system was introduced. His attempts to reform teachers' pay and bring in new contracts were opposed by the trade unions and led to a series of one-day strikes.

In 1984, his public spending negotiations with his Treasury colleagues resulted in a proposed plan for extra research funding for universities financed through the curtailment of financial support to students who were dependent children of more affluent parents. That plan provoked heated opposition from fellow members of the Cabinet (particularly, Cecil Parkinson) and a compromise plan was found necessary to secure consensus. The compromise involved the abandonment of Joseph's plan to levy tuition fees but preserved his aspiration to abolish the minimum grant. The resulting loss to research funding was halved by a concession of further revenue by the Treasury team.

Joseph emerged unscathed from the Brighton hotel bombing during the Conservative Party Conference in 1984. In 1985, he published a White Paper on the university sector, The Development of Higher Education into the 1990s. It advocated an appraisal system to assess the relative quality of research and foresaw a retrenchment in the size of the higher education sector. Both proposals were controversial. Joseph was the primary influence on the Education (No. 2) Act 1986, enacted soon after his resignation as secretary, which abolished corporal punishment in most schools, established regular parents' meetings, and increased parents' influence in school governance.

== Backbenches, retirement and peerage ==
Joseph stepped down from the Cabinet in 1986, and retired from Parliament at the 1987 election. He was appointed to the Order of the Companions of Honour in 1986. He received a life peerage in the dissolution honours, being created Baron Joseph, of Portsoken in the City of London on 12 October 1987. Joseph died on 10 December 1994.

=== 30-year rule and official documents ===
At the end of 2011, the release of confidential documents under the UK Government's 30-year rule revealed Joseph's thoughts regarding the Liverpool riots. In response to Michael Heseltine's regeneration proposal, Joseph suggested that there should be a "managed rundown" of Merseyside instead. Later, his private secretary asked for minutes of a meeting to be amended to remove reference to explicit economic regeneration as Joseph believed "it is by no means clear that any such strategy could lead to a viable economic entity".

== Legacy ==
Joseph's 1976 speech "Monetarism Is Not Enough" was described by Margaret Thatcher as "one of the very few speeches which have fundamentally affected a political generation's way of thinking". Joseph's political achievement was in pioneering the application of monetarist economics to British political economics, and in developing what would later become known as Thatcherism. He had a famously self-deprecating style, remarking of the prospect of his becoming Leader of the Conservative Party that "it would have been a disaster for the party, country, and me", and he rated himself a failure in office. The Sir Keith Joseph Memorial Lecture is held annually by the Centre for Policy Studies.

== Personal life ==
Joseph was married twice: first, in 1951, to Hellen Guggenheimer, with whom he had four children. They separated in 1978, finally divorcing in 1985. In 1990 he married Yolanda Sheriff (née Castro), whom he had known since the 1940s.

Coat of arms of Keith Joseph
Crest In front of an Annulet Azure encircling a Tower Gules two Sprigs of Honesty leaved and slipped saltirewise proper Escutcheon Per chevron Gules and barry wavy of ten Azure and Or a Fess embattled of the last masoned Sable in chief a Sun in Splendour Gold Motto Incepta perficiam (May I bring to perfection that which I have begun)

Parliament of the United Kingdom
Preceded by Osbert Peake	Member of Parliament for Leeds North East; 1956–1987	Succeeded by Timothy Kirkhope
Political offices
Preceded by Charles Hill	Minister for Housing and Local Government; 1962–1964	Succeeded by Richard Crossman
Preceded by Richard Crossman	Secretary of State for Social Services; 1970–1974	Succeeded by Barbara Castle
Preceded by Eric Varley	Secretary of State for Industry; 1979–1981	Succeeded by Patrick Jenkin
Preceded by Mark Carlisle	Secretary of State for Education and Science; 1981–1986	Succeeded by Kenneth Baker
Baronetage of the United Kingdom
Preceded by Samuel Joseph	Baronet (of Portsoken); 1944–1994	Succeeded by James Joseph
