= Viscount Samuel =

Viscountcy in the Peerage of the United Kingdom

Viscountcy of Samuel
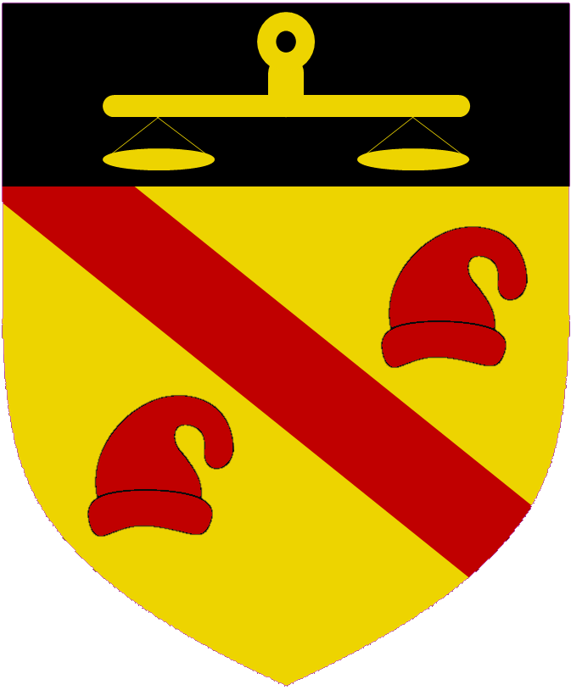
- Escutcheon: Or a Bend between two Caps of Liberty Gules on a Chief Sable a Balance of the first: Crest: In front of a Sun rising Or a Dove wings elevated and addorsed holding in the beak an Olive Branch proper; Supporters: On either side a Lion Or the dexter gorged with a Collar Gules and resting the interior hind leg on a Stump of Oak eradicated and sprouting proper the sinister gorged with an Eastern Crown also Gules and resting the interior hind leg on a Stump of Olive eradicated and sprouting also proper
- Creation date: 8 June 1937
- Created by: King George VI
- Peerage: Peerage of the United Kingdom
- First holder: Sir Herbert Samuel
- Present holder: Jonathan Samuel
- Heir presumptive: The Hon. Benjamin Samuel
- Remainder to: Heirs male of the first viscount's body, lawfully begotten
- Motto: Turn Not Aside

Herbert Samuel, 1st Viscount Samuel

Viscount Samuel, of Mount Carmel and of Toxteth in the City of Liverpool, is a title in the Peerage of the United Kingdom. It was created on 8 June 1937 for the Liberal politician and former High Commissioner of the British Mandate of Palestine, Sir Herbert Samuel. His grandsons, the third and fourth Viscounts, were respectively a prominent Israeli chemist and neurobiologist, and an oil executive. As of 2014 the title is held by the 4th Viscount's son, who succeeded as fifth Viscount in that year.

The first Viscount Samuel was the nephew of the banker Samuel Montagu, 1st Baron Swaythling.

== Viscounts Samuel (1937) ==
- Herbert Louis Samuel, 1st Viscount Samuel (1870–1963)
- Edwin Herbert Samuel, 2nd Viscount Samuel (1898–1978)
- David Herbert Samuel, 3rd Viscount Samuel (1922–2014)
- Dan Judah Samuel, 4th Viscount Samuel (1925–2014)
- Jonathan Herbert Samuel, 5th Viscount Samuel (b. 1965)

The heir presumptive and currently last in line is the present holder's half-brother, The Hon. Benjamin Angus Samuel (b. 1983).

== See also ==
- Baron Swaythling
