= Charles Jessel =

British businessman; (1860–1928)

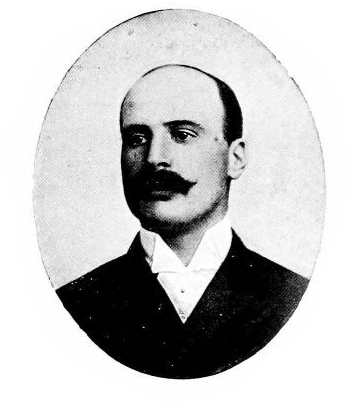
Jessel in 1899

Sir Charles James Jessel, 1st Baronet DL, JP (11 May 1860 – 15 July 1928), was a British barrister, magistrate and businessman.

Jessel was the eldest son of Sir George Jessel, Master of the Rolls, by Amelia Moses. Herbert Jessel, 1st Baron Jessel, was his younger brother. He was educated at Rugby School and Balliol College, Oxford (MA) and was called to the bar at Lincoln's Inn. He was created a Baronet, of Ladham House in the parish of Goudhurst in the County of Kent, in May 1883, in honour of his father, who had died in March of that year.

He was vice-chairman of the British North Borneo Company (BNBC) (1903–1909). The city of Kota Kinabalu was previously named Jesselton after the BNBC set up operations there. Jessel was also a deputy lieutenant and justice of the peace for Kent and served as High Sheriff of Kent in 1903.

Jessel married Edith Goldsmid, daughter of Sir Julian Goldsmid, 3rd Baronet, in 1890. They had two sons and two daughters. He died in July 1928, aged 68, and was succeeded in the title by his eldest son, George. Lady Jessel died in January 1956.

Baronetage of the United Kingdom
New creation	Baronet (of Ladham House); 1883–1928	Succeeded by George Jessel
