= George Jessel (judge) =

British politician and judge (1824–1883)

The Right Honourable Sir George Jessel FRS
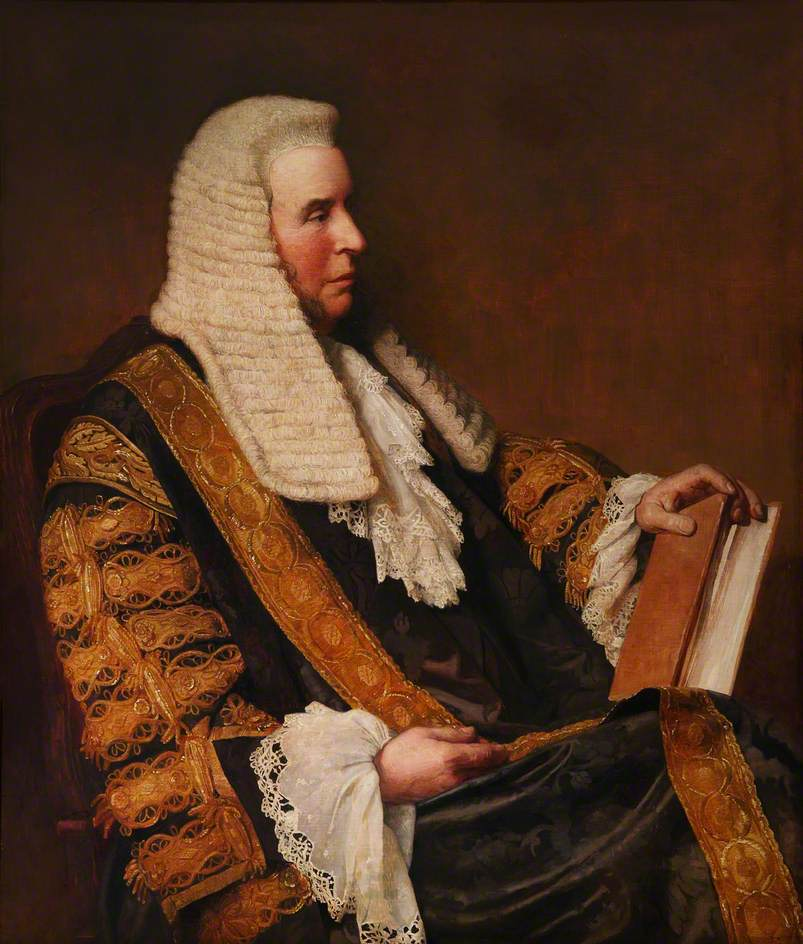

Master of the Rolls
- In office 1873–1883
- Preceded by: The Lord Romilly
- Succeeded by: The Lord Esher

Solicitor General for England and Wales
- In office 1871–1873

Personal details
- Born: 13 February 1824 London
- Died: 21 March 1883 (aged 59) London
- Resting place: Willesden United Synagogue Cemetery
- Spouse: Amelia Moses (m. 1856)
- Children: 5
- Education: University College London

Sir George Jessel, PC, FRS (13 February 1824 – 21 March 1883) was a British barrister, politician, and judge. He was one of the most influential commercial law and equity judges of his time, and served as the Master of the Rolls. He was the first Jew to be a regular member of the Privy Council and to hold high judicial office.

== Early life and education ==
Born in Savile Row, London, Jessel was the son of Zadok Aaron Jessel, a Jewish merchant, and his wife Mary, née Harris. He was educated at Mr Neumegen's School for Jews at Kew, and being prevented by religious disabilities from proceeding to the University of Oxford or Cambridge, went to University College London, matriculating in 1840. He entered Lincoln's Inn as a student in 1842, and a year later took his BA at the University of London, becoming MA and gold medallist in mathematics and natural philosophy in 1844. In 1846 he was elected a fellow of University College, London.

He entered Lincoln's Inn in 1842 as a student and was called to the bar in 1847, taking chambers in Stone Buildings. He read in the chambers of the conveyancer Peter Bellinger Brodie, and was the pupil of Edward John Lloyd and of Barnes Peacock.

== Legal and political career ==
Jessel's earnings during his first three years at the bar were 52, 346, and 795 guineas, from which it will be seen that his rise to a tolerably large practice was rapid. His work, however, was mainly conveyancing, and for long his income remained almost stationary. By degrees, however, he got more work, and was appointed Queen's Counsel in 1865, becoming a bencher of his Inn in the same year and practising in the Court of Chancery. Jessel entered Parliament as Liberal Party member for Dover in 1868, and although neither his intellect nor his oratory was of a class likely to commend itself to his fellow-members, he attracted William Ewart Gladstone's attention by two learned speeches on the Bankruptcy Bill which was before the house in 1869, with the result that, in early November 1871, he was appointed Solicitor General. In 1872, he was knighted.

His business, in addition to that on behalf of the Crown, became very large, and his income for three years before he was raised to the bench amounted to nearly £25,000 per annum.

== Master of the Rolls ==
In 1873, Jessel succeeded Lord Romilly as Master of the Rolls, the Attorney-General (J. D. Coleridge) having refused the office. On accepting the position, he resigned from Parliament, and was sworn of the Privy Council.

From 1873 to 1881, Jessel sat as a judge of first instance in the rolls court, being also a member of the Court of Appeal and the Judicial Committee of the Privy Council.

In November 1874, the first Judicature Act came into effect, combining the existing royal courts into a single High Court of first instance and the Court of Appeal. In 1881 the Judicature Act of that year made the Master of the Rolls the ordinary president of the Court of Appeal, relieving him of his duties as a judge of first instance. In the Court of Appeal Jessel presided almost to the day of his death.

On 22 February 1878, Jessel survived an assassination attempt by Henry John Dodwell, a disturbed clergyman.

For some time before 1883 he suffered from diabetes with chronic disorder of the heart and liver, but struggled against it. On 16 March 1883 he sat in court for the last time, and five days later he died, aged 59, at his residence in London, the immediate cause of death being cardiac syncope. The following day, the Court of Appeal adjourned in his honour.

== Legacy ==
As a judge of first instance Jessel was a revelation to those accustomed to the proverbial slowness of the chancery courts and of the Master of the Rolls who preceded him. He disposed of the business before him with rapidity combined with correctness of judgment, and he not only had no arrears himself, but was frequently able to help other judges to clear their lists. His knowledge of law and equity was wide and accurate, and his memory for cases and command of the principles laid down in them extraordinary. In the rolls court he never reserved a judgment, not even in the Epping Forest case (Commissioners of Sewers v Glasse, L.R. 19 Eq.; The Times, 11 November 1874), in which the evidence and arguments lasted twenty-two days (150 witnesses being examined in court, while the documents went back to the days of King John), and in the Court of Appeal he did so only twice, and then in deference to the wishes of his colleagues.

The second of these two occasions was the case of Robarts v The Corporation of London (49 Law Times 455; The Times, 10 March 1883), and those who may read Jessel's judgment should remember that, reviewing as it does the law and custom on the subject, and the records of the city with regard to the appointment of a remembrancer from the 16th century, together with the facts of the case before the court, it occupied nearly an hour to deliver, but was nevertheless delivered without notes this, too, on 9 March 1883, when the judge who uttered it was within a fortnight of his death. Never during the 19th century was the business of any court performed so rapidly, punctually, and satisfactorily as it was when Jessel presided.

He was Master of the Rolls at a momentous period of legal history. The Judicature Acts, completing the fusion of the courts of law and equity, were passed while he was judge of first instance, and were still new to the courts when he died. His knowledge and power of assimilating knowledge of all subjects, his mastery of every branch of law with which he had to concern himself, as well as of equity, together with his willingness to give effect to the new system, caused it to be said when he died that the success of the Judicature Acts would have been impossible without him.

Jessel sat on the royal commission for the amendment of the Medical Acts, taking an active part in the preparation of its report. He actively interested himself in the management of London University, of which he was a fellow from 1861, and of which he was elected vice-chancellor in 1880. He was one of the commissioners of patents, and trustee of the British Museum. He was also chairman of the committee of judges which drafted the new rules rendered necessary by the Judicature Acts. He was treasurer of Lincoln's Inn in 1883, and vice-president of the council of legal education. He was also a fellow of the Royal Society.

Jessel's career marks an epoch on the bench, owing to the active part taken by him in rendering the Judicature Acts effective, and also because he was the last judge capable of sitting in the House of Commons, a privilege of which he did not avail himself. He was the first Jew who, as solicitor-general, took a share in the executive government of his country, the first Jew who was sworn a regular member of the privy council, and the first Jew who took a seat on the judicial bench of Great Britain.

== Family ==
Jessel married in 1856 Amelia Moses, daughter of Joseph Moses, who survived him together with three daughters and two sons, the elder of whom, Charles, was made a baronet shortly after the death of his distinguished father and in recognition of his services (see Jessel Baronets). Jessel's younger son Herbert Jessel was elevated to the peerage as Baron Jessel in 1924.

A great-nephew of Jessel, Richard Frederick Jessel, was a naval hero of the Second World War. Richard's son, Toby Jessel, was Conservative MP for Twickenham from 1970 until 1997. Richard's daughter, Camilla Jessel, was the second wife of the Polish composer Andrzej Panufnik.

He was the second cousin once removed of the American vaudeville star and comedian George Jessel, who was named after him.

== Cases ==
- Printing and Numerical Registering Co v Sampson (1875) 19 Eq 462, 465, freedom of contract and patents
- Singer Manufacturing Co v Wilson (1876) LR 2 CD 447
- Lysaght v Edwards (1876) 2 Ch D 499, right to a lien over an asset until purchase money is paid up
- Commissioners of Sewers v Gellatly (1876) 3 Ch D 615, lawsuits with representatives of unincorporated associations on behalf of others allowed to prevent a failure of justice
- Pender v Lushington (1877) 6 Ch D 70, vote as a property right
- Griffith v Paget (1877) 5 Ch D 894, a scheme of arrangement in insolvency
- In re David Lloyd & Co (1877) 6 ChD 339, when a winding up order takes effect assets become those of creditors
- Re Hall and Barker (1878) 9 Ch D 538, 545 '...If a shoemaker agrees to make a pair of shoes, he cannot offer you one shoe, and ask you to pay one half of the price.'
- Re Rica Gold Washing Co (1879) 11 Ch D 36, fraud in winding up
- In re Hallett's Estate (1880) 13 Ch D 696, 710
- Redgrave v Hurd (1881) 20 Ch D 1, misrepresentation is still actionable when the misrepresentee has the chance to double check and fails to do so
- Couldery v Bartram (1881) 19 Ch D 394, 399, attacking the doctrine of part payments of debt being unable to extinguish the whole
- Wheeler v Le Marchant (1881) 17 Ch D 681, communications of a priest as privileged communications
- Turner v Hancock (1882) 20 ChD 303, 305, concerning trustees' remuneration
- Ex Parte Hall (1882) 19 Ch D 580, 584
- Tempest v Lord Camoys (1882) LR 21 ChD 571, relating to a trustees' duty to be active
- In re Taylor's Estate (1882) 22 Ch D 495, 503, mistakes
- Speight v Gaunt (1882) 22 Ch D 727, 739, Sir George Jessel MR, 'It seems to me that on general principles a trustee ought to conduct the business of the trust in the same manner that an ordinary prudent man of business would conduct his own, and that beyond that there is no liability or obligation on the trustee.'
- Imperial Hydropathic Hotel Co v Hampson (1883) LR 23 Ch D 1 - a UK company law, concerning the interpretation of a company's articles of association in the matter of removal of directors.

== Sources ==
- Leigh Rayment's Peerage Pages
- See The Times, 23 March 1883; E Manson, Builders of our Law (1904).

Parliament of the United Kingdom
Preceded by Charles Freshfield; Alexander George Dickson	Member of Parliament for Dover; 1868 – 1873; With: Alexander George Dickson	Succeeded by Edward William Barnett; Alexander George Dickson
Political offices
Preceded by Sir John Coleridge	Solicitor General for England and Wales; 1871–1873	Succeeded by Sir Henry James
Legal offices
Preceded by The Lord Romilly	Master of the Rolls; 1873–1883	Succeeded by Viscount Esher
Academic offices
Preceded by John Lubbock, 1st Baron Avebury	Vice-Chancellor of University of London; 1881–1883	Succeeded by Sir James Paget
