= Joseph baronets =

Baronetcy in the Baronetage of the United Kingdom

There have been two baronetcies created for persons with the surname Joseph, both in the Baronetage of the United Kingdom. One creation is extinct while one is extant.

The Joseph baronetcy, of Stoke-on-Trent in the County of Stafford, was created in the Baronetage of the United Kingdom on 8 July 1942 for the businessman Francis L'Estrange Joseph. The title became extinct on his death in 1951.

The Joseph baronetcy, of Portsoken in the City of London, was created in the Baronetage of the United Kingdom on 16 November 1943 for the businessman Samuel Joseph. He was co-chairman and managing director of the construction company Bovis and also served as Lord Mayor of London from 1942 to 1943. He was succeeded by his son, the second Baronet. He was a prominent Conservative politician and served under Margaret Thatcher as Secretary of State for Industry from 1979 to 1981 and as Secretary of State for Education and Science from 1981 to 1986. In 1987 he was created a life peer as Baron Joseph, of Portsoken in the City of London, in the Peerage of the United Kingdom. On Lord Joseph's death in 1994, he was succeeded in the baronetcy by his son, the third Baronet, who did not use his title or prove his succession to the baronetcy and was therefore not on the Official Roll of the Baronetage, with the baronetcy considered dormant and on his 2019 death his son did not seek to prove his own succession as fourth baronet.

== Joseph baronets, of Stoke-on-Trent (1942) ==
- Sir Francis L'Estrange Joseph, 1st Baronet (1870–1951)

== Joseph baronets, of Portsoken (1943) ==
- Sir Samuel George Joseph, 1st Baronet (1888–1944)
- Sir Keith Sinjohn Joseph, 2nd Baronet (1918–1994) (created a life peer as Baron Joseph in 1987)
- Hon. Sir James Samuel Joseph, 3rd Baronet (1955–2019)
- Presumed 4th baronet: Sam Nathan Joseph (born 1991)

The heir presumptive is the present holder's brother Thomas Owain Joseph (born 1994).

Coat of arms of Joseph baronets
Crest In front of an Annulet Azure encircling a Tower Gules two Sprigs of Honesty leaved and slipped saltirewise proper Escutcheon Per chevron Gules and barry wavy of ten Azure and Or a Fess embattled of the last masoned Sable in chief a Sun in Splendour Gold Motto Incepta perfliciam (I will do to perfection what I have started)
