= Jessel baronets =

Set index for Jessel baronets

There have been two baronetcies created for members of the Jessel family, both in the Baronetage of the United Kingdom. As of 2026 one creation is extant.

- Jessel baronets of Ladham (1883)
- Jessel baronets, of Westminster (1917): see Baron Jessel
