= Leeke =

Leeke is a surname. It may refer to:

- Alicia Leeke (b. ?), U.S. painter and artist
- Edward Leeke (c. 1600 – 1643), English landowner and politician
- Edward Tucker Leeke (1842–1925), British clergyman and scholar
- Ferdinand Leeke (1859–1923), German painter
- George Leeke (died 1939), Irish nationalist politician
- Henry Alan Leeke (1879–1915), British track and field athlete and Olympic competitor
- Henry John Leeke (1794–1870), British Royal Naval officer
- Henry Leeke (athlete) (c. 1846 – 1922), British amateur athlete, and Olympic competitor
- Jane Leeke Latham (1867–1938), British headteacher and missionary to India
- John Leeke (1843–1919), British Anglican bishop
- Newton Leeke (1854–1933), British Anglican bishop
- Samuel Leeke (died 1775), British magistrate, land owner, and deputy lieutenant
- Thomas Leeke Massie (1802–1898), British officer of the Royal Navy
- William Leeke (1797–1879), British army officer and clergyman
