= Henry Leeke =

Henry Leeke or Leek may refer to:

== People ==
- Henry Leeke (athlete) (died 1922), Cambridge athlete
- Henry Alan Leeke (1879–1915), British track and field athlete and Olympian, son of Henry Leeke
- Sir Henry John Leeke (1794–1870), Admiral in the Royal Navy and MP

== Fictional characters ==
- Henry Leek, character in The Great Adventure (1921 film)
- Henry Leek, character in Holy Matrimony (1943 film)

== See also ==
- Henry Leke, MP
