= William Leeke =

British Army officer and cleric (1797–1879)

- Born: 27 November 1797
- Died: 6 June 1879 (aged 81)
- Burial place: St Michael's Church, Holbrook
- Alma mater: University of Cambridge
- Military career
- Allegiance: United Kingdom
- Branch: British Army
- Service years: 1815–1824
- Rank: Lieutenant
- Unit: 52nd Regiment of Foot
- Known for: Military author
- Conflicts: Napoleonic Wars; Battle of Waterloo
- Other work: Vicar of Holbrook (1840–1879)

William Leeke (27 November 1797 – 6 June 1879) was a British Army officer and clergyman, known for his published reminiscences of the Waterloo Campaign, which form a primary source for many modern histories of the campaign.

== Early life ==
Leeke was born on the Isle of Wight to a naval family, who owned an estate in Hampshire. He was the son of Samuel Leeke, a deputy lieutenant of Hampshire, and his wife, Sophia, daughter of Capt. Richard Bargus, R.N. His elder brother Sir Henry John Leeke rose to the rank of admiral in the Royal Navy. Leeke's eldest brother Thomas Samuel had also served in the navy, but died off Cádiz in 1810, while serving as a lieutenant. His sister, Urania, married Admiral Sir Edward Tucker.

== Military experience ==
William Leeke obtained his commission as an ensign in the 52nd (Oxfordshire) Regiment of Foot through the influence of Sir John Colborne (later Lord Seaton), the regiment's colonel, who was his relative (Leeke's maternal uncle, Thomas Bargus, who had married Colborne's mother). (Colborne's father had died in 1785, when he was seven). Originally joining the 52nd as a Gentleman Volunteer in May 1815, he was gazetted ensign almost immediately, the promotion dated 4 May. He was only 17, which made him the youngest ensign at Waterloo.

He carried the 52nd's Regimental colours during the Battle of Waterloo, which gave him a good understanding of the 52nd's actions during the battle.

Leeke purchased his promotion to lieutenant on 20 November 1823, and remained in the 52nd until 2 September 1824 when he exchanged into the 42nd Regiment of Foot, on half-pay. Despite the fact that he was by then studying at Cambridge, he returned to full-pay as a lieutenant in the Ceylon Regiment on 28 May 1828, by exchange. He sold out on 28 August 1828.

== University studies and work for the Church of England ==
After leaving the army, Leeke attended Queens' College, Cambridge, gaining a BA in 1829 and an MA in 1832. In 1829 Leeke was ordained deacon in the Church of England, serving as curate at Westham, Sussex. He was ordained priest in 1830, by the Bishop of Chichester, and in 1831 became stipendary curate at Brailsford with Osmaston, Derbyshire. Then, in 1840, was appointed Perpetual curate of Michael's Church at Holbrook in Derbyshire, living in Holbrooke Hall, with Thomas William Evans as a patron. Leeke was also Rural Dean of Duffield, from 1849.

While at Cambridge, in 1827 Leeke instituted the Jesus Lane Sunday School in an attempt to improve conditions in the local slums. His work eventually resulted in the establishment of an elementary school, which has now evolved into Parkside Community College. His four sons also volunteered at the Sunday School during their respective times in Cambridge while students at Trinity.

He wrote a number of works on church matters, including an address on the abolition of pluralities.

== Family ==
In 1828, Leeke married Mary Ann Cox, daughter of John Cox, of Derby. Her sister Maria married George Gawler, a fellow officer of Leeke's from the 52nd Foot.

They had four sons – Edward Tucker, Henry, John Cox and Samuel – and four daughters.

Two of Leeke's sons entered the church. Edward Tucker became sub-dean of Lincoln Cathedral, and John Cox was made Bishop of Woolwich in 1905. Henry was a notable athlete, competing in the throwing events for Cambridge University, and English Amateur champion for the hammer throw. His son, Henry Alan Leeke, represented Great Britain in the throwing events at the 1908 Summer Olympics. Samuel was a barrister at Lincoln's Inn. He was called to the bar in 1873, and worked up until his death at 77 in 1925. He was known for his skill as a conveyancer and equity draftsman, and also worked successfully as an advocate, with a reputation for not losing cases. His obituary in The Times commended his "charming manner and old-world courtesy", and described him as "a fine old English gentlemen" who excited respect and affection from those who met him.

In 1863, Leeke's eldest daughter Sophia married Thomas Berry Horsfall, MP for Liverpool; she was his third wife, and died in 1867. His daughter Jane married Edward Latham (d. 1883), housemaster of Repton School then vicar of Holy Trinity Church, Matlock Bath. Edward and Jane had ten children, including Jane Leeke Latham, an educationalist and missionary.

Leeke died at Holbrook Hall, near Derby. There is a stained glass memorial to him and his wife in St Michael's Church, Holbrooke. A street in Cambridge was named after Leeke, but has now been demolished.

== The History of Lord Seaton's Regiment ==
The history of Lord Seaton's regiment, (the 52nd light infantry) at the battle of Waterloo; together with various incidents connected with that regiment, not only at Waterloo but also at Paris, in the north of France, and for several years afterwards: to which are added many of the author's reminiscences of his military and clerical careers during a period of more than fifty years was published in two volumes in 1866.

Leeke's account of the Battle of Waterloo caused some controversy, since he claimed that official records erred in ascribing the defeat of Napoleon's Imperial Guard to the British 1st Foot Guards. Leeke claimed that the 52nd Foot alone, under the command of Sir John Colborne (later Lord Seaton), was responsible for turning the flank of the Imperial Guard in the last stages of the battle, ensuring the victory, stating on the title page of both volumes that:

The author claims for Lord Seaton and the 52nd the honour of having defeated, single-handed, without the assistance of the 1st British Guards or any other troops, that portion of the Imperial Guard of France, about 10,000 in number, which advanced to make the last attack on the British position.

Leeke also lamented that Wellington's despatches had unfairly made no mention of Colborne's vital command, and the 52nd's "daring feat". His memoirs were partly inspired by what he felt to be a "very great injustice [that] has been done to Lord Seaton and the 52nd Light Infantry, which regiment he commanded at Waterloo, by those who have attempted, in subsequent years, to write the history of that great battle", and that he considered "the truth, with regard to what we knew the 52nd had achieved at Waterloo, ought to see the light".

== Published works ==
- A Few Suggestions for Increasing the Incomes of many of the Smaller Livings and for the almost total Abolition of Pluralities, more especially addressed to the Members of Both Houses of Parliament , Derby : Printed by William Bemrose, and sold by Hatchard, 1838.
- Memorials to the Archbishop of Canterbury, from Seventy-two of the Clergy of Derbyshire, on the Abolition of Pluralities, 1839
- The history of Lord Seaton's regiment, (the 52nd light infantry) at the battle of Waterloo ..., volume 1, London : Hatchard and co. 1866.
- The history of Lord Seaton's regiment, (the 52nd light infantry) at the battle of Waterloo ..., volume 2, London : Hatchard and co. 1866.
- Papers on The Observance of the Lord's Day
