= Listed buildings in Holbrook, Derbyshire =

Holbrook is a civil parish in the Amber Valley district of Derbyshire, England. The parish contains 14 listed buildings that are recorded in the National Heritage List for England. Of these, one is listed at Grade II*, the middle of the three grades, and the others are at Grade II, the lowest grade. The parish contains the village of Holbrook, the hamlet of Coxbench, and the surrounding area. Most of the listed buildings are houses, cottages and associated structures, farmhouses and farm buildings. The other listed buildings include a church and associated structures, and two former stocking frame knitter's workshops.

== Key ==
Grade	Criteria
II*	Particularly important buildings of more than special interest
II	Buildings of national importance and special interest

== Buildings ==
Name and location	Photograph	Date	Notes	Grade
Highfields Farmhouse and outbuildings 53.00123°N 1.45753°W		17th century	The farmhouse, which was extended later, is in sandstone on a plinth, with a coved eaves band, and a slate roof with coped gables. There are two storeys and attics, and an irregular plan, with a range of two bays, a gabled cross-wing to the east, and a single-bay extension angled to the west, attached to which is a range of outbuildings. The doorway has a quoined surround and a bracketed open pediment, and most of the windows are mullioned, some with hood moulds. In the cross-wing are two dove holes, and in the outbuildings are doorways with quoined surrounds, windows, and two hayloft doors. Inside the farmhouse is an inglenook fireplace.	II
Coxbench Hall and stable blocks 52.98761°N 1.44962°W		Early 18th century	A house that has been altered and extended and later used for other purposes, it is in painted and rendered brick and sandstone, with floor bands, a moulded cornice, coped parapets, and hipped Welsh slate roofs. There are three storeys, a square plan, a two-storey extension at the northwest, and an L-shaped range of stables to the north. On the east front is a Doric porch with an iron balcony, and a round-headed doorway with a double keystone and a traceried fanlight. Most of the windows are sashes, or casements simulating sashes, and in the garden front is a bow window. In the stable block is a segmental arch with an initialled and dated keystone, and a water trough similarly inscribed.	II
Holbrook Hall; 52.99752°N 1.46036°W	—	Early 18th century	The house, with an attached earlier cottage, has been extended and used for other purposes. The buildings are in sandstone, and the house has a plinth, rusticated quoins, a floor band, a moulded eaves cornice, and a hipped tile roof. There are two storeys and attics, and a front of five bays, flanked by two-bay extensions. On the garden front, semicircular steps lead to a doorway with a moulded segmental pediment, and the windows are sashes, the window above the doorway with a keystone and a moulded segmental pediment. In the roof are two gabled dormers. The extension to the south contains bay windows with balustraded parapets, and the cottage has a three-light mullioned window and casement windows.	II*
Farm buildings, Highfield Farm; 53.00103°N 1.45763°W	—	Mid 18th century	The farm buildings are in sandstone with tile roofs, two storeys and an irregular plan. They contain doorways, windows, a hayloft door, louvred vents, and attached to the north range, is a series of stone troughs.	II
Rachdale Lodge; 52.99102°N 1.46041°W	—	Mid 18th century	The house, which was later altered and extended, is in sandstone, and has a tile roof with coped gables and plain kneelers. There are two storeys and attics, and a front of three bays. On the front is a blocked doorway with a quoined surround, and to its left is a gabled porch. Most of the windows are mullioned, in the right two bays are gabled dormers, and the left bay contains a gabled half-dormer.	II
Workshop behind 18 and 20 Town Street; 53.00056°N 1.45853°W	—	18th century	An outbuilding with a former stocking frame knitter's workshop above, later used for other purposes, the ground floor is in sandstone, the upper floor in red brick, and it has a tile roof. There are two storeys and two bays. In the ground floor are two doorways and a lean-to. The upper floor contains two three-light wide casement windows on the east side, and similar fixed windows on the west side. There is a flight of stone steps up to a first floor door on the north gable wall.	II
St Michael's Church; 52.99802°N 1.45929°W		1761	The church was largely rebuilt in 1841, restored in 1887, and in 1907–08 the chancel and porch were added. The church is built in sandstone, with a slate roof and angle pilasters. It consists of a nave, a south aisle, a north porch, and a chancel with a north vestry. At the west end are three round-arched windows, over which is an open pediment and a pedimented bellcote. On the north side of the church are windows with pointed beads and Y-tracery, at the east end is a large Diocletian window, and an open pediment above containing a clock face, and the windows on the south front have round-arched heads.	II
Nether Cottage and outbuildings 52.99944°N 1.45633°W	—	Late 18th century	The farmhouse and outbuildings are in sandstone with slate roofs. The house has two storeys and three bays, and the outbuilding to the south has one storey and two bays. On the front of the house is a central latticed porch and a doorway with a quoined surround, and the windows are mullioned. In the outbuilding are two doorways with large lintels, and a casement window.	II
Outbuildings and gingang, Birchwood Farm; 52.98593°N 1.45392°W	—	Early 19th century	The barn, stables, cowsheds, and gin gang are in sandstone, the main range has a slate roof, the gin gang has a tile roof, and the cowsheds have corrugated iron roofs. The main range has four bays, and is in one and two storeys, and the other buildings have a single storey. In the main range are stable doors, windows, and a blocked segmental arch, in the cowsheds is a lunette, and the gin gang has large doors to the angled walls.	II
Oakdene Cottage; 52.99825°N 1.45885°W	—	Early 19th century	A sandstone cottage with a tile roof, two storeys and two bays. In the centre is a gabled porch, to its right is a two-light casement window, to the left is a small square window, and in the upper floor are two horizontal-sliding sash windows.	II
Stables, Holbrook Hall; 52.99789°N 1.46063°W	—	Early 19th century	The stable block and coach house, later converted for residential use, are in sandstone, partly roughcast, with a slate roof and overhanging eaves. There are two storeys and five bays. The middle bay contains a segmental-headed arch with quoined jambs and a traceried fanlight. In the outer bays are windows with pointed heads.	II
Workshop behind 10 Town Street; 52.99997°N 1.45907°W	—	Early 19th century	The former stocking frame knitter's workshop, later used for other purposes, is in red brick with a tile roof. There are two storeys and two bays. In the ground floor are inserted double doors and a segmental-headed doorway, and the upper floor contains two wide three-light casement windows. On the south gable end is a flight of external stone steps.	II
Walls, gates and war memorial, St Michael's Church; 52.99841°N 1.45927°W	—	c. 1841	To the east and west of the churchyard are curving gritstone walls with rounded copings, containing a pair of wrought iron gates over which a scrolled overthrow with a fleur-de-lys finial and a lantern arch. To the right, dating from about 1920, is a granite war memorial in the form of a Celtic cross. On its head is carved interlace decoration, on the sloping base are inscribed the names of those lost in the First World War, and attached to the wall is a plaque with more names.	II
Brook House; 53.00217°N 1.46287°W	—	1899	A convalescent home, later used for other purposes, it is in gritstone with applied half-timbering and a Welsh slate roof. There are two storeys, a T-shaped plan, and a symmetrical front of nine bays, the outer bays projecting as gabled cross-wings, and the middle bay containing a porch, and rising to a clock tower. The porch has a segmental arch and a hood mould, over which is a parapet and an inscribed gablet. Above this is a window with pilasters, and a carved panel. The clock tower is roughcast and has a clerestory and a pyramidal roof with a weathervane. Between the entrance and the outer bays is an arcade with lean-to roofs on moulded columns, and the gables in the outer bays have applied half-timbering and bargeboards. All the windows are mullioned and transomed.	II
