= St Mary's School, Gerrards Cross =

Independent school in Gerrards Cross

Coordinates: 51.5934°N 0.5523°W

Location
- Packhorse Road; Gerrards Cross, Buckinghamshire, SL9 8JQ; England

Information
- Former names: St Mary's College, Lancaster Gate
- Motto: Embrace - Empower - Excel
- Established: 1872
- Headmaster: Lars Fox
- Age: 3 to 18
- Houses: Butler; Temple West; Kirk; Latham
- Website: stmarysschool.co.uk

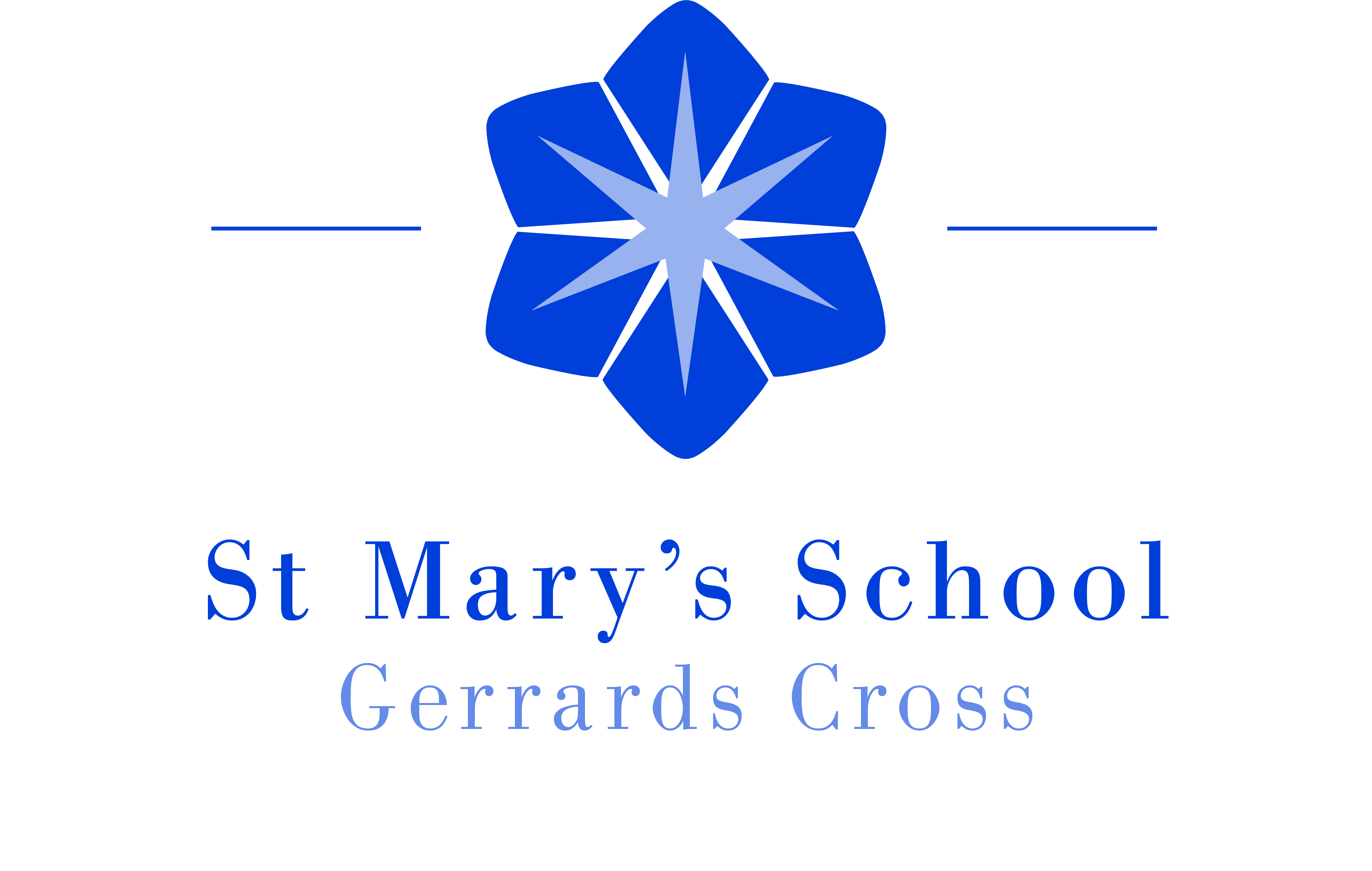
St Mary's School, Gerrards Cross

St Mary’s School, Gerrards Cross is an independent day school for girls aged 3–18 situated in the heart of Gerrards Cross in South Buckinghamshire, England.

The current Head is Lars Fox. There are around 350 pupils, 110 of whom are in the Prep Department.

== History ==
St Mary’s School was established in 1872 by the Anglican Foundation of The Sister of the Community of St Mary the Virgin in Paddington, London. However the finances became precarious and in 1901 the college was relaunched by a new management committee. Jane Latham became the principal of both the college and the school. In 1904 the school passed its inspection and Latham was credited with much of the improvement. Latham left the school to establish a new career as a missionary in India.

The school relocated to Lancaster Gate in 1911, where it was known as St Mary’s College. In 1937 the school relocated to its present site, Orchehill House, in Gerrards Cross.

The religious teaching in the school has changed since it was first established by the Community of St Mary the Virgin but the school remains associated with the Church of England, though girls of all religions and denominations are admitted.

In 2016 the Sixth Form facilities were upgraded with the opening of Cedar House and a new classroom block, Cherry Tree House, was added in 2018.

== Facilities ==
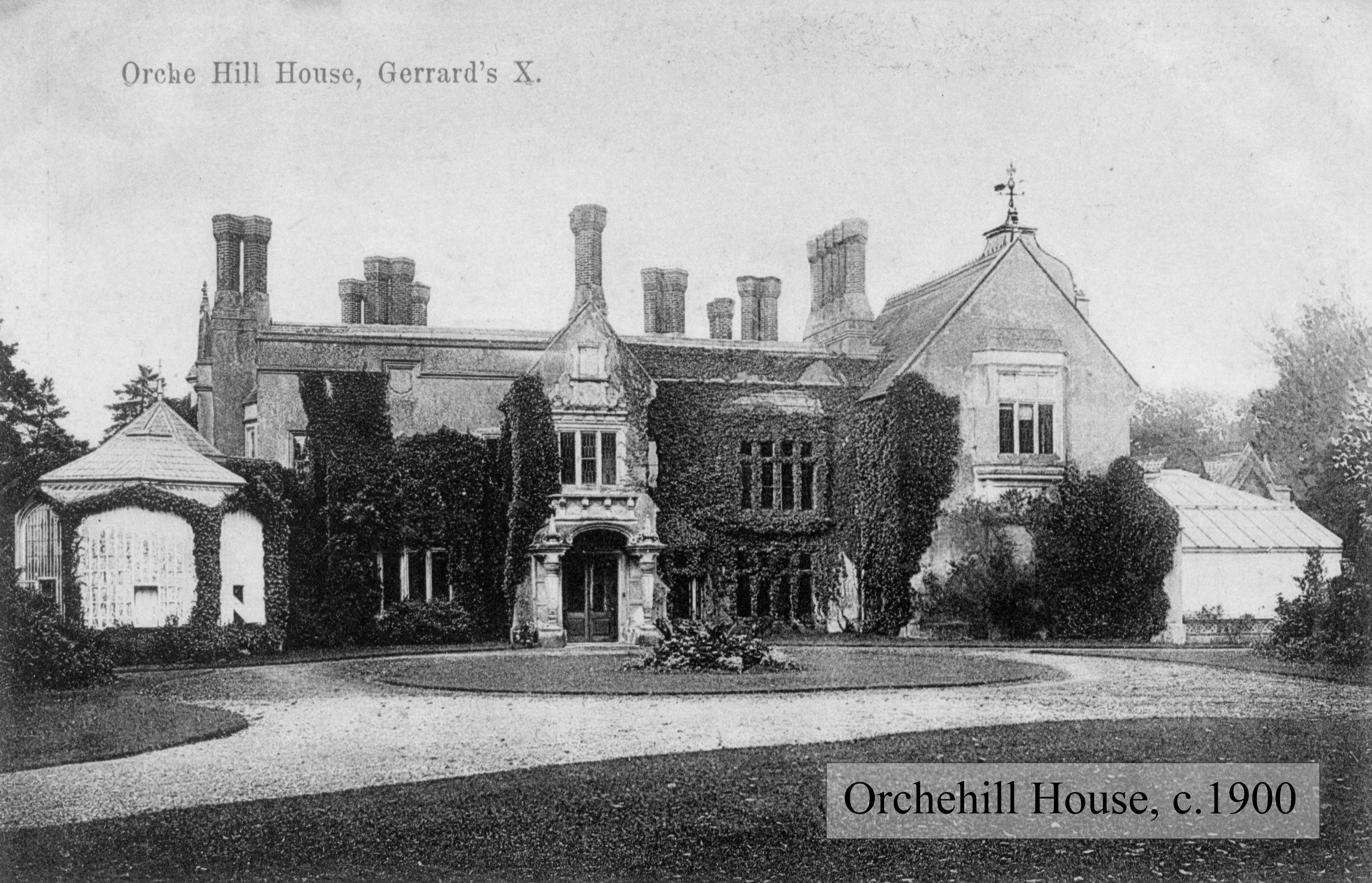
St Mary's School building

The school has traditional buildings with period features as well as new classroom blocks, providing a wide range of facilities. Pre-Prep are in Paddington House, whilst the remaining year groups of the Prep Department are in the Oakdene and Smith buildings.

Senior House is in Orchehill House, the original building, as well as Cherry Tree House. The Sixth Form is in a dedicated facility, Cedar House.

== Co-curricular ==
There is a range of co-curricular clubs available in both the Prep Department and Senior School including tap dancing, chess, gymnastics, crafting, a wide variety of sports, language clubs, cookery, puzzle club, football, Economics Society, media club, dance, playwriting, choirs, orchestra and bands, book club, drama club, street dance, debating, the Duke of Edinburgh awards.

== Headteachers ==
- Sister Kate (C.S.M.V), 1874
- Sister Mary Louisa (C.S.M.V), 1876
- Sister Mary Monica (C.S.M.V), 1877
- Sister Geraldine (C.S.M.V), 1885
- Sister Louisa (C.S.M.V), 1885
- Sister Mary Margaret (C.S.M.V), 1886
- Sister Madeline (C.S.M.V), 1886
- Jane Leeke Latham, 1901-1909
- Helena Powell, 1909-1925
- Dorothy Apperson, 1925-1942
- Winifred Joan Chalk, 1942-1967
- Hazel Thomas, 1967-1969
- Victor Joseph Bailey, 1969-1973
- Audrey Timberlake, 1973-1984
- Joan Lilwall Smith, 1984-1995
- Fanny Balcombe, 1995-2010
- Jean Ross, 2010-2018
- Patricia Adams, 2018 - 2025

== Notable alumnae ==
- Gwyneth Bebb

She was the first woman to graduate from Oxford with a First in Jurisprudence and was the sole woman in her undergraduate class of 400. Gwyneth famously argued the case of Bebb v. The Law Society in 1913. Though the judgment was against her, this case paved the way for women to be admitted to the legal profession in Britain in 1919.

- Marie Laura Violet Gayler

A metallurgist who specialized in aluminium alloys and dental amalgams. Gayler was one of the first two women to join the scientific staff at the National Physical Laboratory.

- Tessa Hilton

A prominent British magazine executive and a former newspaper editor.

- Lin Huiyin

A renowned writer and the pioneer as the first female architect in modern China.
