= Coxbench Hall =

Country house in Derbyshire, England

Coordinates: 52.9876°N 1.4497°W

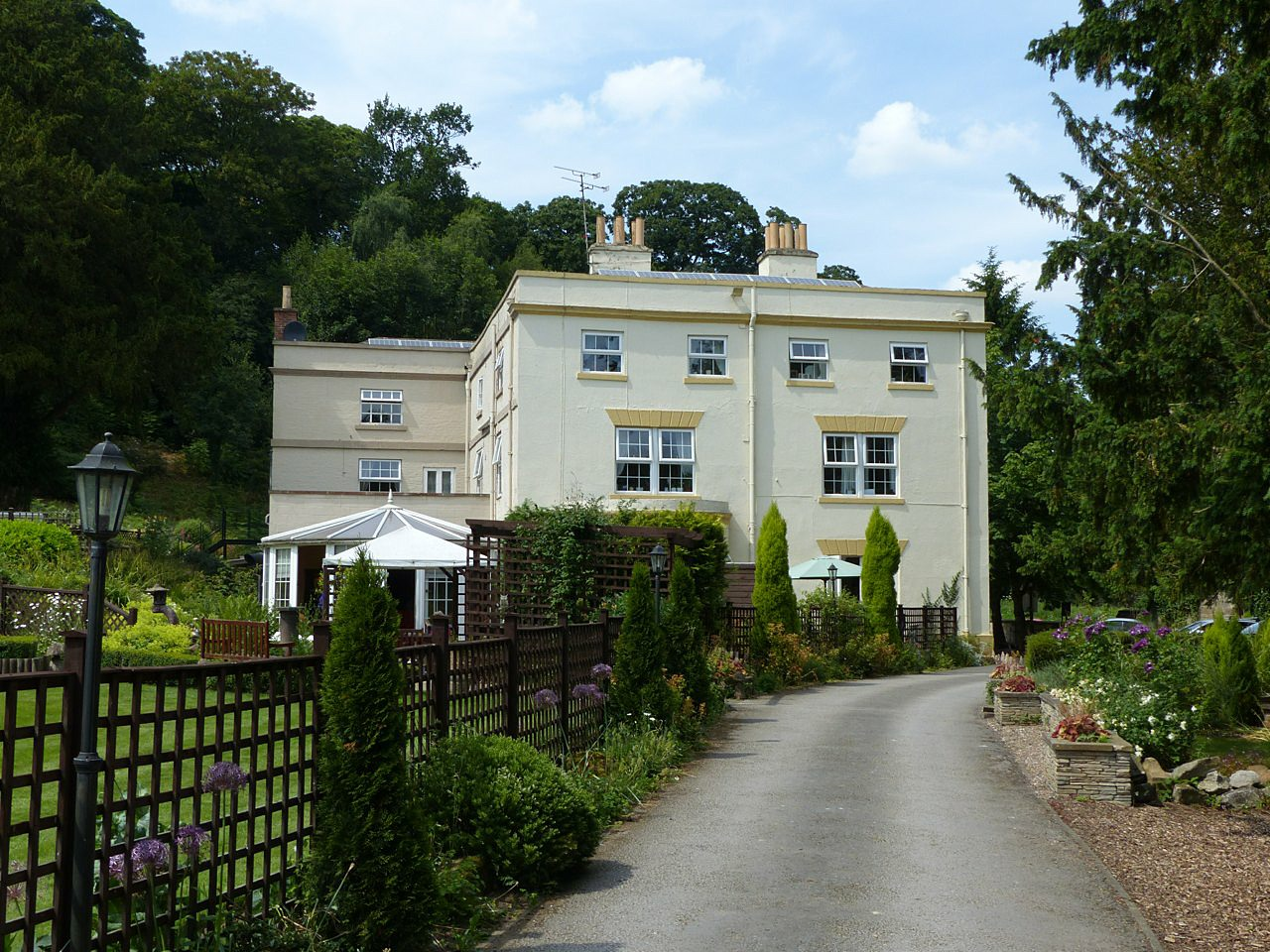
Coxbench Hall

Coxbench Hall is a late 18th-century country house, now in use as a residential home for the elderly, situated at Holbrook, Amber Valley, Derbyshire. It is a Grade II listed building.

The Manor of Coxbench was held anciently by the Franceys family until the daughter and heiress of the last male Franceys married William Brooks. Their grandson William Brooks Johnson (1763–1830) replaced the old manor house with the present house built by John Chambers of Horsley Woodhouse.

The main block is built to a square plan, with a three-storey, three-bayed entrance front to the east, which carries a Tuscan porch with iron balustrading. A service wing to the north west incorporates a datestone inscribed WB1774. A stable block continues the range to the north.

The property had numerous occupants during the 19th century, including Meynell and Alleyne.

Since 1984 the house has been in use as a residential care home for the elderly, and has gained the status of being a Quality Premium Home. There are also award-winning Close Care Apartments in the beautiful grounds.

== History ==
The book called Magna Britannia written in 1817 states that “a capital messuage, called Cocksbench, or Coxsbench, with a considerable estate adjoining, belonged for many generations to the ancient family of Franceys, whose residence it was. It is now the property of William Brooks Johnson, M.D., whose grandmother was the eldest daughter and coheir of Mr. Robert Franceys, the last heir male of the family.”

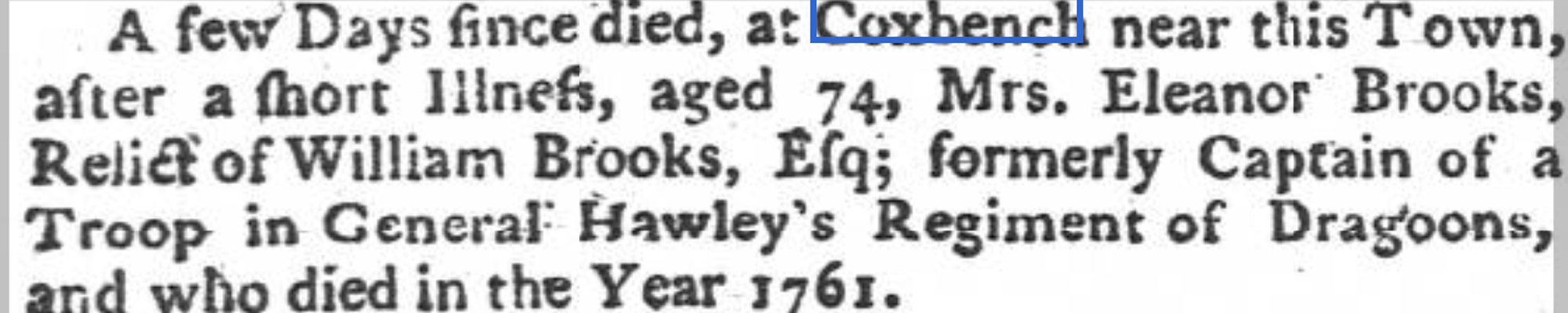
Death notice of Eleanor Brooks 1772

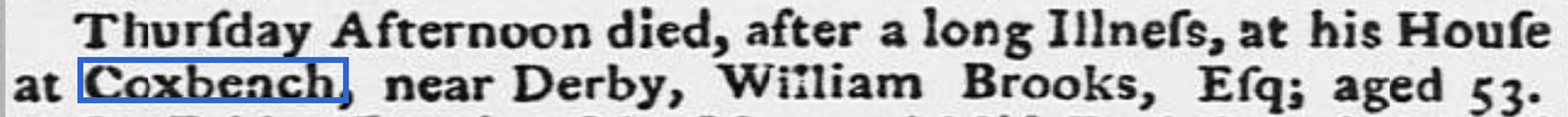
Death notice of William Brooks, son of Eleanor Brooks 1777

Historical documents reveal that Robert Franceys died in 1715 and was buried at Duffield. His eldest daughter was Eleanor Franceys (1698-1772). In about 1720 she married William Brooks (died 1761) and Coxbench Hall was brought into the Brooks family. The couple had three children William, Dorothy and Eleanor. The son William Brooks (1724-1777) inherited the house but his mother Eleanor continued to live in it until her death in 1772. William died in 1777 but appears to have no children so he left it to his sister Eleanor Brooks. She had married Joseph Johnson in 1756 so the property was brought into the Johnson family. Eleanor and Joseph Johnson’s eldest son was William Brooks Johnson who inherited the property.

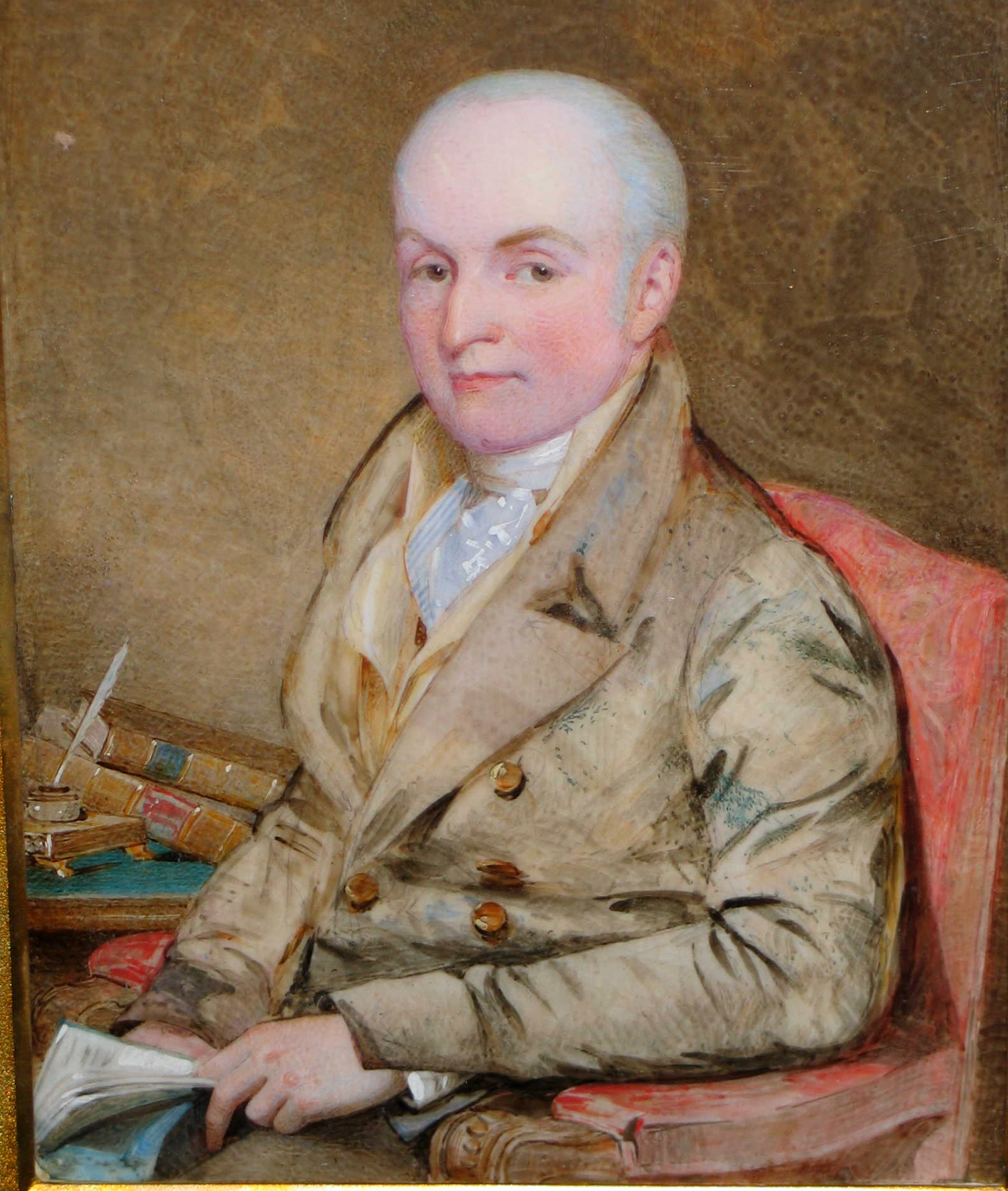
William Brooks Johnson (1763-1830}

William Brooks Johnson (1763-1830) was a doctor, a philosopher, a botanist and chemist. He wrote numerous books and was very active in intellectual circles such as the Derby Philosophical Society where he became friends with Erasmus Darwin. In 1813 he married Sarah Slack (1775-1843) and the couple had two daughters. When William died in 1830 he left the house to his wife Sarah. She is recorded in the 1841 Census as living at the Hall with her two daughters Eleanor and Sarah. Eleanor died in 1842 at the age of 26 leaving her sister Sarah Brooks Johnson (1817-1890} as the sole heir.

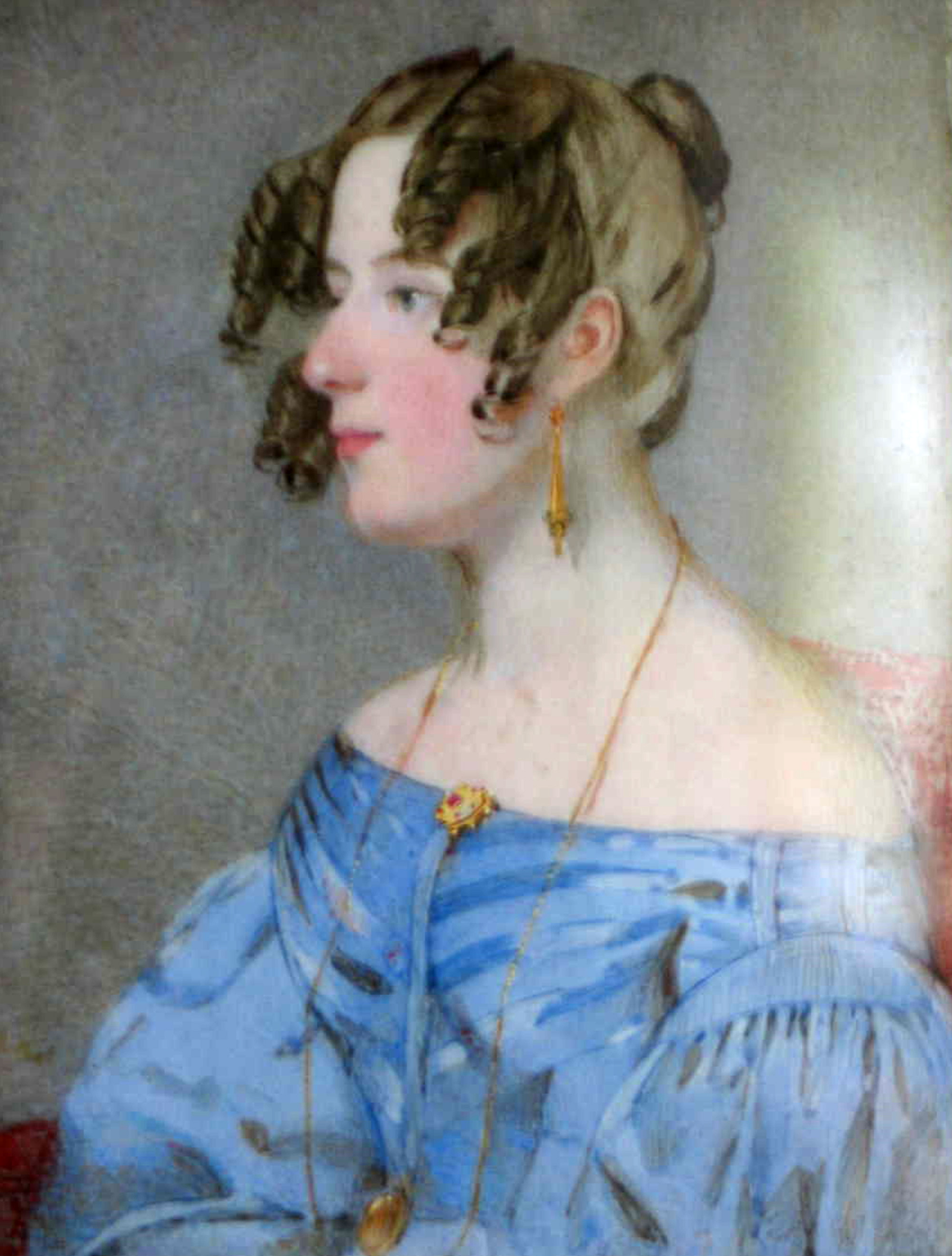
Sarah Brooks Johnson, daughter of William Brooks Johnson and wife of John Meynell

Sarah married John Meynell (1807-1851) in 1842 and so Coxbench Hall was brought into the Meynell family. The couple had six children in the next nine years. John was the eldest son of Godfrey Meynell (1779-1854) who owned the large estate called Meynell Langley in Derbyshire. He was therefore the expected heir of this property. However he predeceased his father when he was killed in 1851 in a tragic railway accident. . Sarah rented Coxbench Hall to wealthy tenents during the time that she was a widow over the next forty years. She also allowed her children to use the Hall as their residence. For example her daughter Susanna who married Reynold Alleyne lived there for some time in 1883 and the couple’s daughter Eleanor was born there. Sarah died in 1890 and left the Hall to her eldest son Godfrey Franceys Meynell.

Godfrey Franceys Meynell (1844-1921) was a wealthy landowner. He had inherited his grandfather’s estate at Meynell Langley in 1854 when he was still a child. In 1866 he married Emma Maria Wilmot (1842-1927) and the couple had six children. The family lived in Meynell Langley Hall and rented Coxbench Hall.

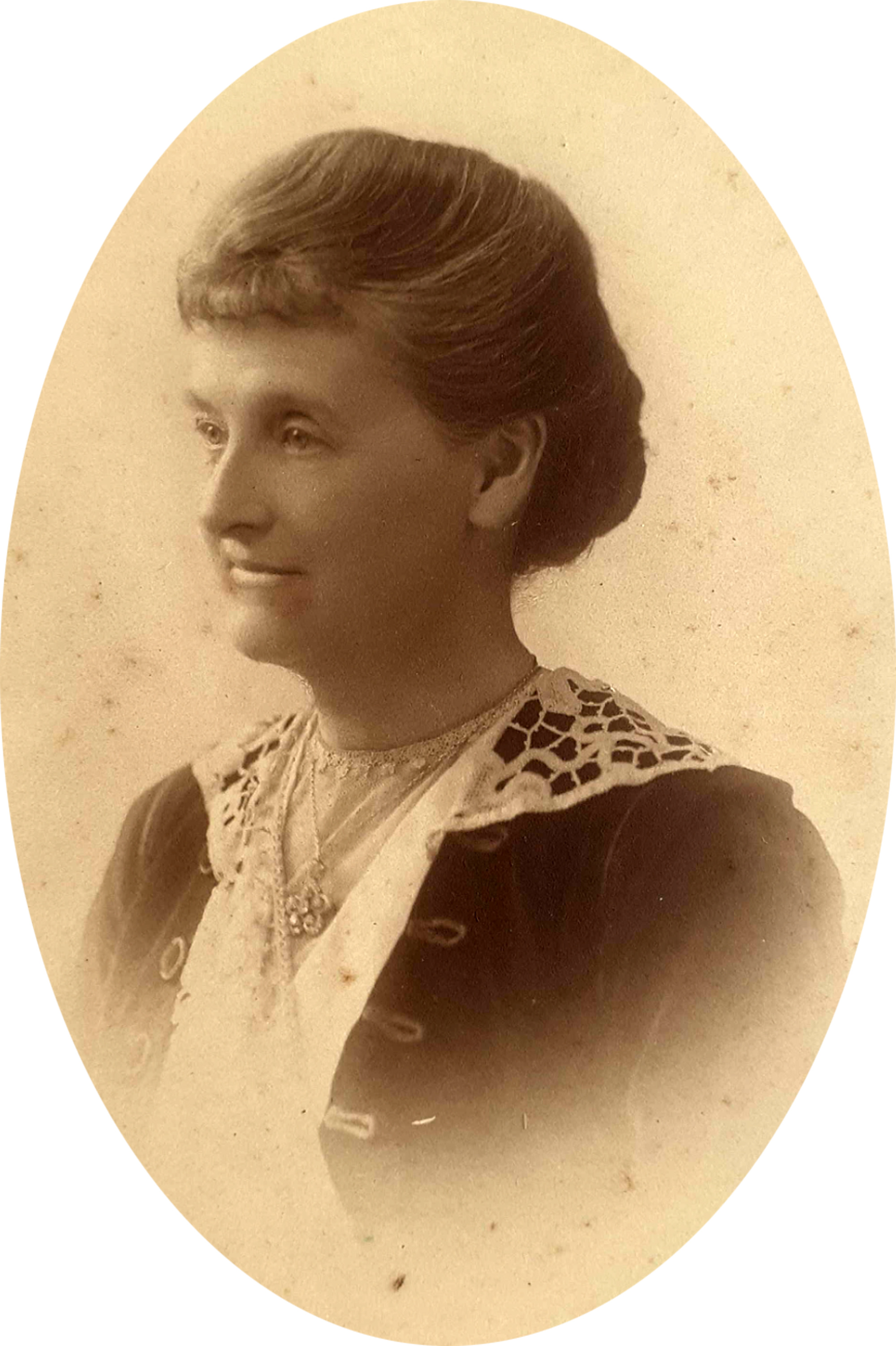
Edith Mildred Cammell (1856-1938)

Their longest resident during this time was Edith Mildred Cammell (1856-1938) whose daughter was married to Godfrey’s eldest son. She moved to the Hall in 1904 the year after her husband George Henry Cammell died and remained there until her death in 1938. She is recorded in the 1911 Census as living at the Hall with her daughter Iris and four servants. During World War I Edith joined the war effort by allowing the Red Cross to use the Hall as a work depot where they could collect and distribute clothes and other items for use by injured servicemen in hospital. During this time Godfrey continued to own the Hall until his death in 1921 when his eldest son Godfrey Meynell (1870-1943) inherited the property.

Godfrey Meynell (1870-1943) as mentioned above had married Edith’s daughter Violet Cammell (1882-1960). The couple lived at Meynell Langley allowing Edith to continue her residence at Coxbench Hall. When she died in 1938 Lieutenant Colonel Thomas Shand moved into the Hall and lived there with his family until his death in 1952. He was the chairman and managing director of Lahane Mackenzie and Shand Ltd who were civil engineering contractors.

Group Captain George Ernest Watt (1908-1990) was the next resident. He lived there with his wife Margaret Olive Miller (1908-1982) (called Pat) until 1967 when they returned to New Zealand. He had a distinguished military career until 1954 when he retired and joined the staff of Rolls Royce, becoming the General Manager of the new test establishment at Sinfin, Derby.

Between 1968 and 1979 Herbert John Hann (1926-2015) lived at Coxbench Hall. He was the Director of various companies. In 1954 he married Brenda Goodwin Walker (1927-2015).

After the Hann family left Doctor Brian Fowler and his wife Doctor Sheila Fowler became the owners of Coxbench Hall. They lived there for five years then in 1984 the Hall was sold and became a care home.

== See also ==
- Listed buildings in Holbrook, Derbyshire
