= St Michael's Church, Holbrook =

St Michael’s Church, Holbrook
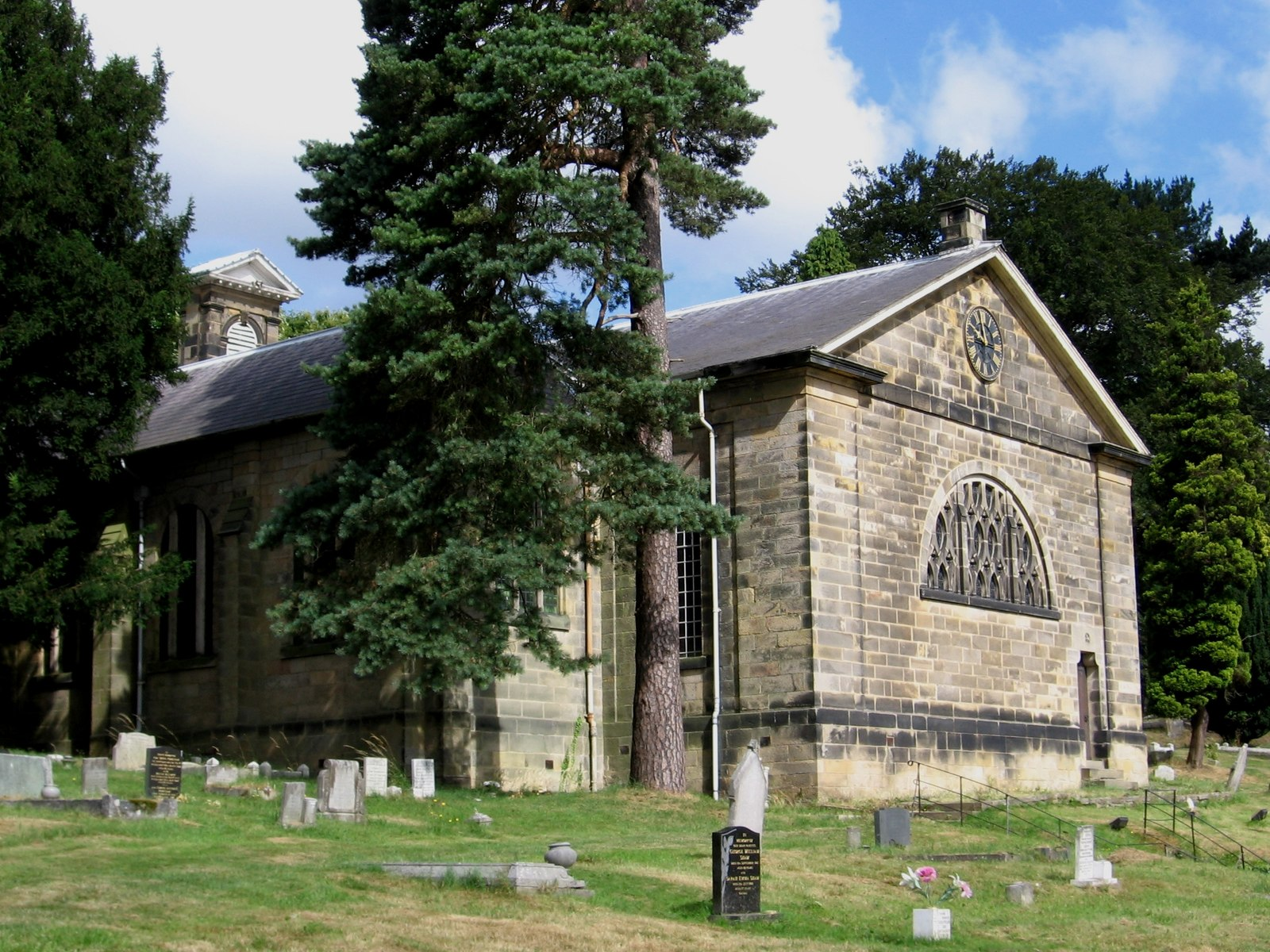
- St Michael’s Church, Holbrook

- Location within Derbyshire
- 52°59′51.95″N 1°27′33.3″W
- Location: Holbrook, Derbyshire
- Country: England
- Denomination: Church of England

History
- Dedication: St Michael

Architecture
- Heritage designation: Grade II listed

Administration
- Province: Canterbury
- Diocese: Derby
- Archdeaconry: Derby
- Deanery: Duffield
- Parish: Holbrook

St Michael's Church, Holbrook is a Grade II listed parish church in the Church of England in Holbrook, Derbyshire.

== History ==
The church foundation is probably medieval, but the current building was built around 1761 as a private chapel for Holbrook Hall. It was consecrated for use as the parish church for the village in 1835. It was rebuilt in 1842 by W. Evans of Allstree. In further alteration in 1887 it was re-seated by Mr Thompson of Derby for Sir William Evans, 1st Baronet. It was re-opened on 1 December 1887 by the Bishop of Southwell.

After a disastrous fire on 27 January 1907 caused by a defective flue it was rebuilt by Naylor and Sale of Derby. They took this opportunity to add a new south aisle, which increased the seating by 75. The church before the fire had no chancel, but this was remedied. Three arches span the old nave, leaving the sanctuary in the centre with new traceried east window, and on one side an entrance with new porch, the other being the organ chamber. The chancel was floored with marble and Hopton stone. Messrs Walker and Slater were the general contractors. The carving in the chancel was done by R. Bridgman of Lichfield, and the altar provided by Wippell and Co of London. The altar hangings were made by Hawes and Son of Norwich. It reopened on 15 April 1908.

A further restoration was undertaken when the church was closed for a few weeks in 1929.

== Parish status ==
The church is in a joint parish with

- Holy Trinity Church, Milford
- St Lawrence's Church, Shottle
- St John the Evangelist's Church, Hazelwood

== Organ ==
The pipe organ dates from ca. 1880 by William Hill. A specification of the organ can be found on the National Pipe Organ Register.

== See also ==
- Listed buildings in Holbrook, Derbyshire
