= William Brooks Johnson =

English physician and botanist (1763–1830)

William Brooks Johnson (1763–1830) (also Brookes) was an English medical doctor and botanist.

== Life ==
He was educated at Repton School and admitted to Christ's College, Cambridge in 1783, graduating M.B. in 1789. He became a medical practitioner with a particular interest in botanical chemistry. He resided at Coxbench Hall, Derbyshire and was a member of the Derby Philosophical Society where he received encouragement from Erasmus Darwin. He associated with Jonathan Stokes and Smithson Tennant.

In 1791 Johnson joined the Derby Constitutional Society. With Henry Redhead Yorke, he wrote the French Revolution-inspired "Derby Address". They took it to Paris, to present to the Constitutional Convention. In 1791 Johnson joined the Derby Constitutional Society. With Henry Redhead Yorke, he wrote the French Revolution-inspired "Derby Address". They took it to Paris, to present to the National Convention. Johnson in 1792 lodged with Tom Paine in the Faubourg Saint-Denis. Both Johnson and Yorke associated with the "British Club" of ex-patriate supporters of the Revolution. They broke with it, however, in 1793, over a resolution of the Club in favour of a French invasion of Great Britain. Yorke left, accused of spying for the British.

== Works ==
Johnson was author of History of the Progress and Present State of Animal Chemistry published in three volumes in 1803. It had an extended review in The Monthly Review for October 1805, which concluded that it was "a laborious collection of facts". From the point of view of clinical chemistry, somewhat neglected at the end of the 18th century, Rosenfeld regards Johnson's work as attempting "to present the subject on a larger scale and with a more connected and systematic arrangement."
