= Henry Leeke (athlete) =

British athlete

Personal information
- Born: 6 February 1846 Holbrook, Derbyshire, England
- Died: 21 February 1922 (aged 76) Leamington Spa, Warwickshire, England

Sport
- Sport: Athletics
- Event: Hammer throw / Shot put
- Club: Trinity College, Cambridge

Henry Leeke (6 February 1846 – 21 February 1922) was a notable British amateur athlete, and Amateur Champion of England in the hammer throw and shot put.

== Early years ==
Born in Holbrook, Derbyshire, Leeke was the son of the Reverend William Leeke and his wife, Mary Anne. His father was a noted Waterloo historian and famous for carrying the Colour of the 52nd Light Infantry during the battle.

== Athletic career ==
He represented the University of Cambridge in the hammer throw and shot put, winning the hammer event against Oxford in 1868. He was recognised as "one of the pioneers of British hammer throwing", and was the 3 x British Champion, winning the AAC Championships in 1868, 1870 and 1872.

== Personal life ==
He married the daughter of Matthew Wise of Shrubland Hall, Leamington, with whom he had five daughters and one son, Henry Alan Leeke, who represented Great Britain at the 1908 Summer Olympics, and who died in 1915.

Leeke died at Cliff House, Leamington on 21 February 1922, aged 76.
