= Samuel Leeke =

British landowner

Samuel Leeke (1754–1806) JP of Havant, was Deputy Lieutenant for the Hampshire a major landowner and magistrate who died joining others in quelling a riot.

He was the son of Samuel Leeke, of Portsmouth. Samuel Leeke snr had been bequeathed Portsea manor by the previous owner John Moody; its manor house remains in the Leeke family. Leeke snr was also bequeathed a share of Havant manor. He died in 1775.

Leeke died "from the effects of over-exertion in the suppression of a riot".

== Family ==
Samuel Leeke married Sophia, daughter of Capt. Richard Bargus of Fareham and Cheltenham, RN. She died on 4 April 1847. Their children were:

- Thomas Samuel – a Lieutenant in the Royal Navy
- Urania
- Ann Sophia
- Henry John (later Sir Henry), Royal Navy Admiral
- William, army officer, Waterloo veteran and historian, clergyman
- Emily
- Sophia
