= Jane Leeke Latham =

British college head and missionary (1867–1938)

Jane Latham
- Born: 3 August 1867; Holbrook, Derbyshire, England
- Died: 5 August 1938 (aged 71); Nashik, British Raj
- Education: Cheltenham Ladies College, Blackheath High School
- Occupations: headteacher and missionary

Jane Leeke Latham (3 August 1867 – 5 August 1938) was a British headteacher at St Mary's School, Gerrards Cross and a missionary to India.

== Life ==
Latham was born in her grandparents' house at the large country house of Holbrook Hall near Belper in Derbyshire. She was the third of ten children and she and her elder siblings learned to be parents to their worker brothers and sisters.

She was educated at Cheltenham Ladies College until in 1883 her father died and her family moved. She moved the to relatively new school of Blackheath High School where she prepared to take mathematics at Girton College. Latham obtained a first class degree and she returned in 1889 to Cheltenham Ladies College to lead their maths teaching. Her boss there was Dorothea Beale until 1897 when she left to be the Warden at Woodard school, St Anne's, at Abbots Bromley. She looked after the girl's welfare and she was also creditted with creating another Woodard school in Scarborough.

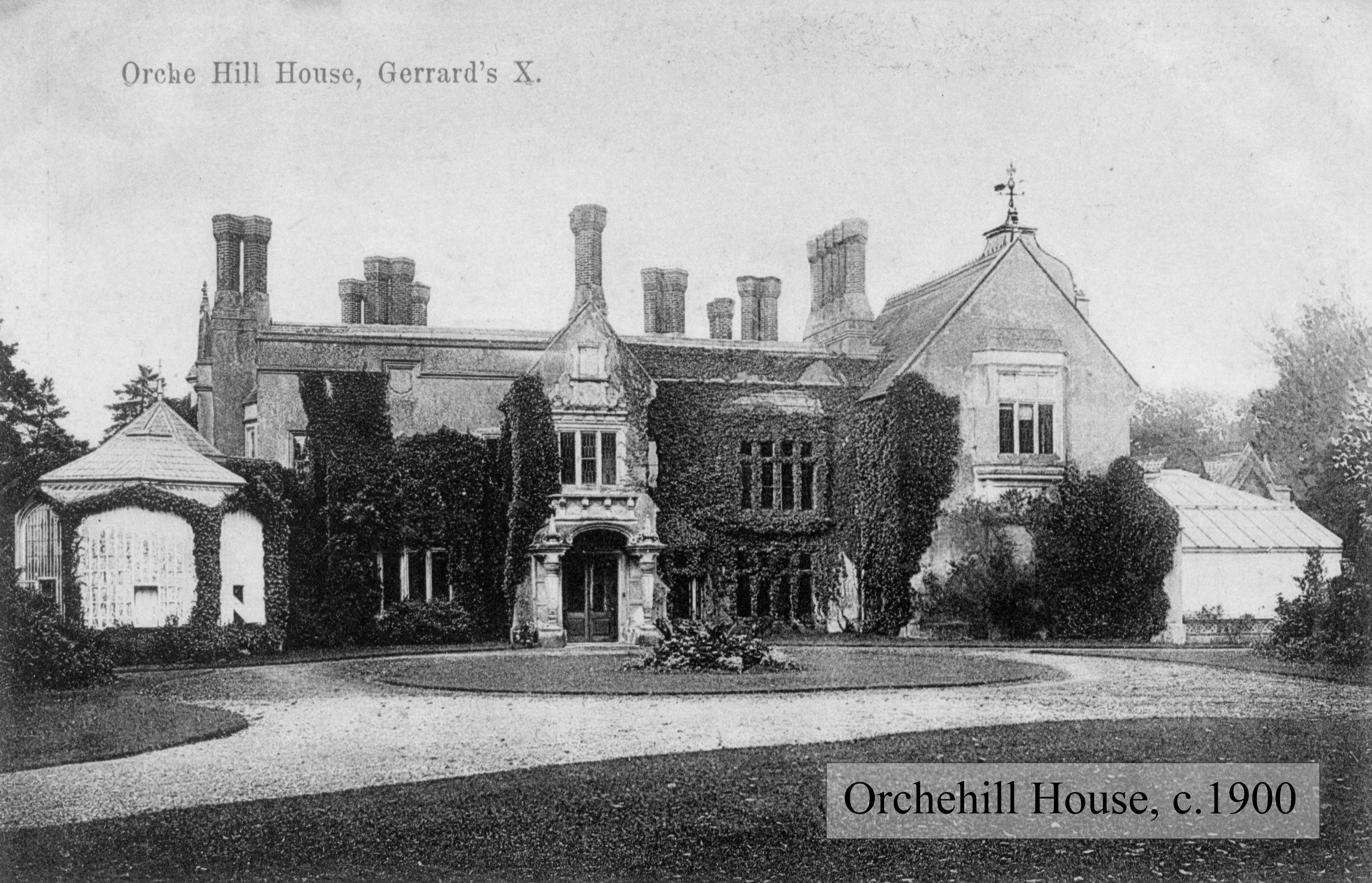
St Mary's School moved much later to Orchehill_House

St Mary's School (later College) had been founded in 1874 by Anglican sisters at Wantage but the finances had become precarious and in 1901 the college was relaunched by a new committee. The college's prime function was to train women to become secondary school teachers, and in 1903 Latham became the principal of both the college and the school. In 1904 the school passed its inspection and Latham was credited with much of the improvement.

She gave up leading schools to take a six-month trip to India to make a report for a conference. However she already decided to be a missionary and she became one in India.

== India ==
In 1910 she helped prepare a report for the World Missionary Conference on "Education in relation to the Christianisation of National Life". Her second career began that year when she became the "head of the women's work" in the mission at Ahmednagar. She was employed in this position for twenty years by the Society for the Propagation of the Gospel. St Monica's school in Ahmednagar was established and this was a school, but importantly it was a training ground for trainee teachers. Latham thought that the training was important not just because it provided the ability to educate. The training established women who were financially independent as Latham saw this as a way to establish a separate Indian Church.

In 1935 she was given time to return to the UK and she also visited the Holy Land as part of the journey. She was 68 and the Bishop made her agree that she must take things easy and there were things that she should stop doing. She did not.

In 1938 her service to India was recognised when the King conferred on her the Kaisar-i-Hind Medal first class.

Latham died in Canada Hospital in 1938 in Nashik from dysentery which she had caught the month before. It was reported that this followed two years of living in poverty with Bhil villagers.
