= Edward Tucker Leeke =

British clergyman and scholar

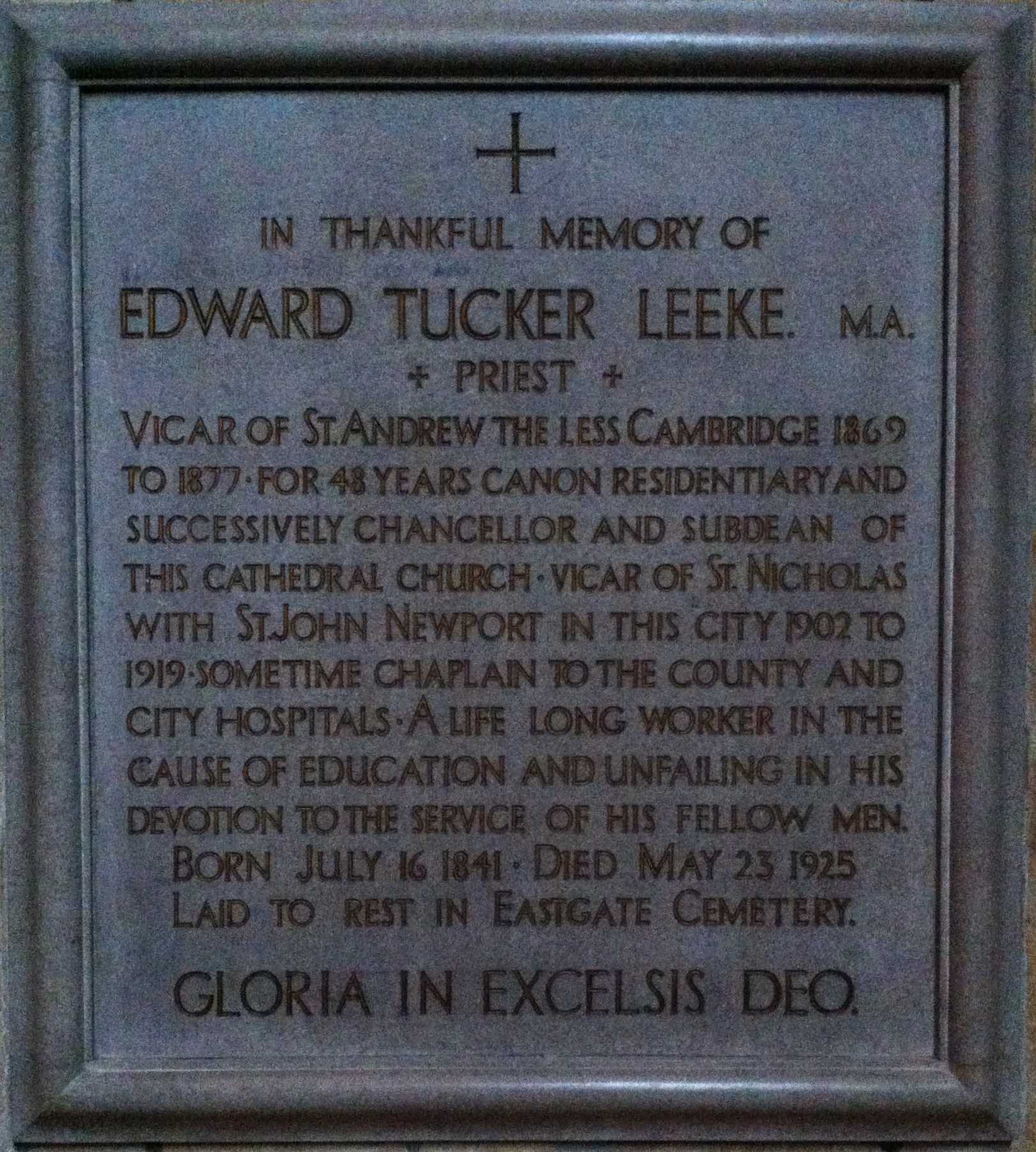
Memorial to Edward Tucker Leeke in Lincoln Cathedral

The Reverend Edward Tucker Leeke (1842–1925) was a British clergyman and scholar. He was Canon and sub-dean of Lincoln Cathedral.

== Early life and education ==
The son of Revd. William Leeke, the Waterloo veteran and historian, Edward Tucker Leeke was born in 1842.

He was educated at Trinity College, Cambridge, where he was awarded Second Wrangler in 1863.

== Career ==
He was made a Fellow of Trinity, and was assistant tutor for some years. He was appointed curate of St Andrew the Less, Cambridge, becoming vicar there in 1869. In 1877 he was made canon and chancellor of Lincoln Cathedral, and sub-dean in 1898. He was chaplain at Lincoln Hospital, and for seventeen years was vicar of St Nicholas with St John-in-Newport, in Lincoln. He wrote Ourselves, our People, our Work: Six addresses given in the Divinity Schools, Cambridge, published in 1891.

== Personal life ==
In 1880 Leeke married Dora Wordsworth, daughter of Christopher Wordsworth, Bishop of Lincoln and younger sister of Dame Elizabeth Wordsworth, first principal of Lady Margaret Hall, Oxford and founder of St Hugh's College. The couple had five sons and two daughters.
