= Henry Alan Leeke =

British track and field athlete

Personal information
- Born: 15 November 1879 Weston, Stafford, England
- Died: 29 May 1915 (aged 35) Aldershot, England

Sport
- Sport: Athletics
- Event: Hammer throw / Shot put
- Club: London Athletic Club; University of Cambridge AC

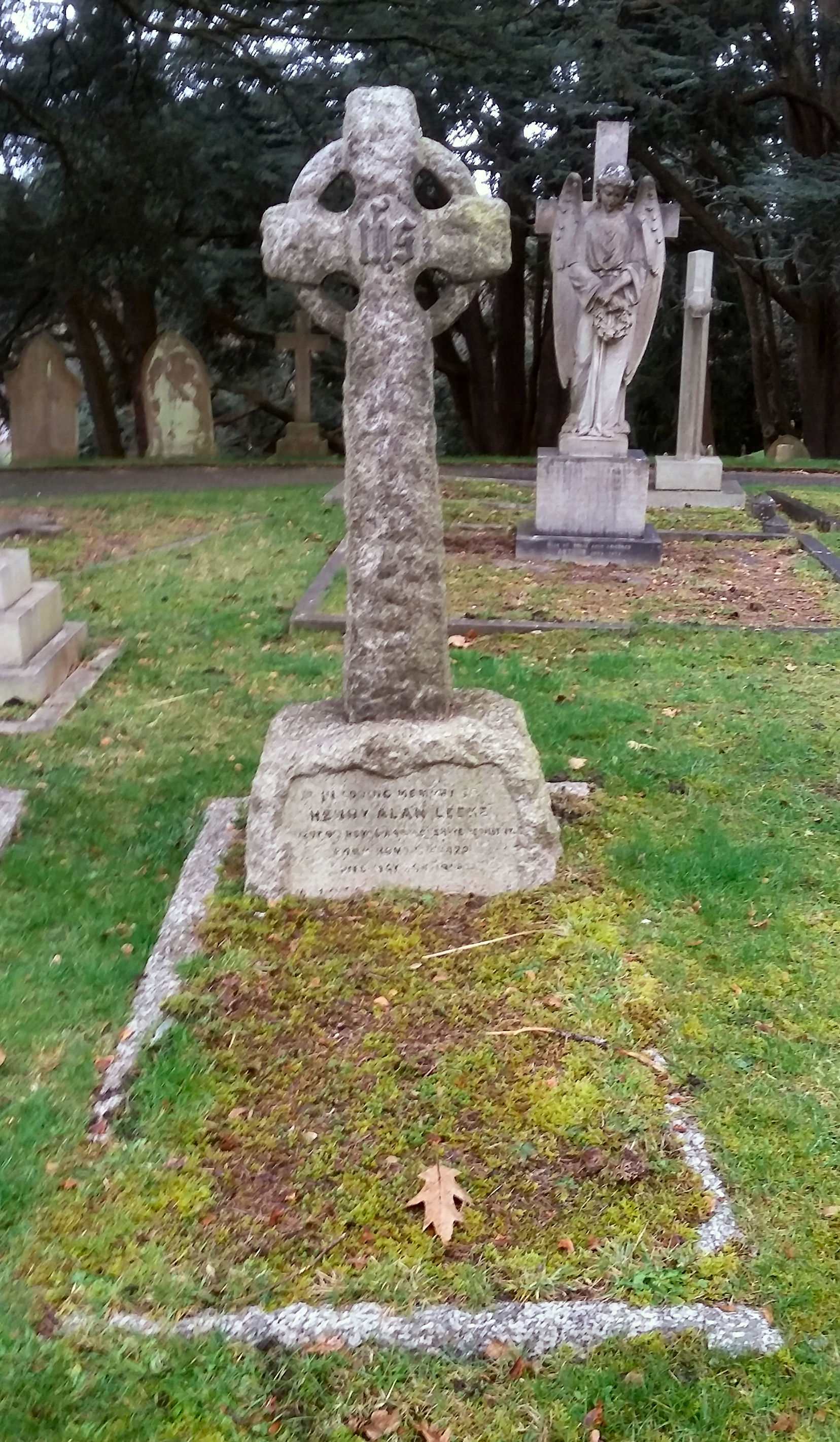
The grave of Henry Alan Leeke in Aldershot Military Cemetery

Henry Alan Leeke (15 November 1879 – 29 May 1915) was a British track and field athlete who competed in the 1908 Summer Olympics.

== Biography ==
Leeke was the only son of Henry Leeke, also an athlete, and grandson of William Leeke, a Waterloo veteran. He was born in Weston, Staffordshire.

As his father did before him, Leeke represented Cambridge University in the hammer and shot put and was English Amateur Champion for both events. He was associated with the London Athletic Club. In 1898, he married Catherine Herbert, younger daughter of Charles G. Fullerton. They had one son and one daughter and resided in Hill, Warwickshire.

He finished third in the hammer throw event behind Tom Kiely and Ernest May at the 1901 AAA Championships and finished runner-up behind Tom Nicolson in the hammer throw at the 1903 AAA Championships. He won the hammer throw at the 1906 AAA Championships.

One of the first British athletes to throw the discus, he set a British record in 1908. During the 1908 Olympic Trials, Leeke threw the javelin 135-8 1/2 (41.37m) in the freestyle event.

In 1908 Leeke participated in the shot put event, in the discus throw competition, in the Greek discus throw event, in the freestyle javelin throw competition, in the javelin throw event, and in the hammer throw competition but in all these competitions his final ranking is unknown.

Shortly after the outbreak of World War I, Leeke joined the Royal Warwickshire Regiment, he was granted a commission as a temporary lieutenant on 22 September 1914, and placed in charge of machine guns for D Company, 9th Battalion. He died of fever at the Thornhill Isolation Hospital, Aldershot on 29 May 1915 aged 35. He is buried in Aldershot Military Cemetery.

== See also ==
- List of Olympians killed in World War I
