= Henry John Leeke =

Royal Navy Admiral (1792–1870)

Admiral Sir Henry John Leeke KCB KH DL
- Born: 1 September 1792; St John's, Isle of Wight
- Died: 26 February 1870 (aged 77); Fareham, Hampshire
- Military career
- Allegiance: United Kingdom
- Branch: Royal Navy
- Service years: 1803–1864
- Rank: Admiral
- Commands: HMS Myrmidon; HMS Queen; HMS San Josef
- Conflicts: Crimean War
- Awards: Knight Commander of the Order of the Bath; Knight of the Royal Guelphic Order

Admiral Sir Henry John Leeke, KCB, KH, DL (1 September 1792 – 26 February 1870) was a Royal Navy officer who went on to be Third Naval Lord, Member of Parliament for Dover and Deputy Lieutenant of Hampshire.

== Career ==
Leeke was born on the Isle of Wight to Samuel Leeke, a deputy lieutenant of Hampshire, and his wife, Sophia, daughter of Capt. Richard Bargus, R.N. His younger brother was William Leeke, known for his reminiscences of his service as an ensign at the Battle of Waterloo. His godfather was Lord Henry Paulet.

Leeke entered the navy in September 1803 aboard the Royal William, as a first-class volunteer. He steadily rose through the ranks until reaching the rank of commander in 1814. In 1818, while in command of HMS Myrmidon he captured a Portuguese slave-vessel, and freed Samuel Ajayi Crowther, who later became Bishop of Nigeria. He was given command of HMS Queen, in which he served as flag-captain to Admiral Sir John West, in 1845 and of HMS San Josef in 1847 and, having been promoted to rear admiral in 1854, he became Third Naval Lord in 1859. His promotion to vice-admiral came in 1860, and to admiral in 1864.

In 1859, he was elected as Conservative Party Member of Parliament for Dover.

He was knighted in the Royal Guelphic Order in 1836, appointed a Companion of the Order of the Bath in 1857, and knighted in that order in 1858.

== Family ==
Leeke married in 1818 Augusta Sophia Dashwood (d. 1861), the second daughter of James Dashwood. They had at least two children. Following Augusta's death, Leeke married (in 1863) Georgiana Lucy Cecilia, only daughter of Revd. Geoffrey Hornby. His eldest and only surviving son, Henry Edward Leeke, died on 2 May 1885, aged 59. His eldest daughter Augusta Sophia Leeke died on 26 February 1903, aged 83.

Military offices
Preceded by Sir Alexander Milne	Third Naval Lord; 1859	Succeeded by Sir Charles Eden
Parliament of the United Kingdom
Preceded by Ralph Bernal Osborne; Sir William Russell, Bt.	Member of Parliament for Dover; 1859 – 1865; With: William Nicol	Succeeded by Alexander George Dickson; Charles Freshfield
