= Holbrook, Derbyshire =

Village in Derbyshire, England

Coordinates: 53.001°N 1.458°W

Holbrook
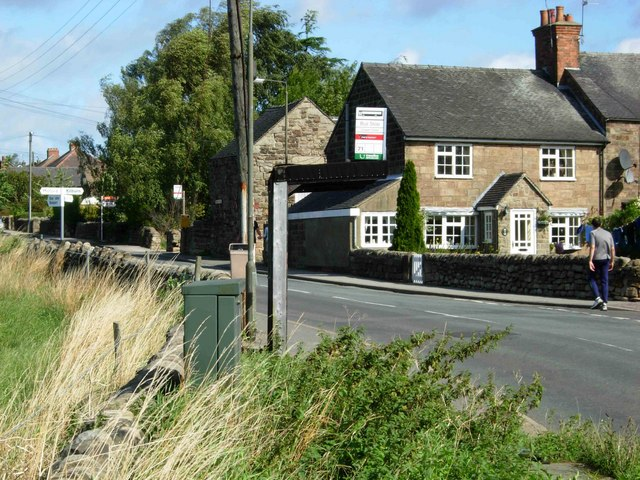
- Holbrook Moor

- Location within Derbyshire
- Population: 1,538 (2011)
- OS grid reference: SK364449
- District: Amber Valley
- Shire county: Derbyshire
- Region: East Midlands
- Country: England
- Sovereign state: United Kingdom
- Post town: BELPER
- Postcode district: DE56
- Police: Derbyshire
- Fire: Derbyshire
- Ambulance: East Midlands
- UK Parliament: Amber Valley

Holbrook is a village in Derbyshire at the southern end of the Pennines around five miles north of Derby, England. The population of the civil parish at the 2011 census was 1,538.

== History ==
Holbrook lies about two miles to the north-east of Duffield, the parish of which it was a part, being within Duffield Frith. When the latter was seized by King Henry III following the rebellion of Robert de Ferrers, 6th Earl of Derby it appears to have been spared. However it became the property of Edmund Crouchback along with the rest of the Frith. It was sold by the Crown to various local copyholders in the reign of Charles I. It included the capital messuage, called Cocksbench, or Coxbench Hall.

Coxbench, which is a hamlet just to the south, but in Horsley parish, is supposed to have been the "Herdebi" mentioned in the Domesday Survey, as held under Henry de Ferrers; and the adjoining part of the manor of Horsley is supposed to have been the "Herdebi" held under Ralph de Burun.

In 1863, Holbrook (or Holbrooke) was created as a separate parish from that of Duffield. St Michael's Church, Holbrook is a simple construction in stone built in 1761 by Rev. S. Bradshaw. It was rebuilt and enlarged in 1841 by the MP William Evans.

It was once served by Coxbench railway station on the Midland Railway Ripley Branch.

=== Notable people ===
- William Brooks Johnson (1763–1830), an English physician and botanist.
- Ernest Townsend (1880–1944), a portrait painter
- Sidney Ottewell (1919–2012), footballer who played about 180 games including 67 for Mansfield Town
- Nigel Hitchin (born 1946), mathematician, worked on differential geometry, algebraic geometry and mathematical physics.
- John Tams (born 1949), actor, singer, songwriter, composer and musician
- Charles Hanson (born 1978), auctioneer and TV personality.

== See also ==
- Listed buildings in Holbrook, Derbyshire
