= Gilles (given name) =

- Pronunciation: French: [ʒil]
- Gender: masculine

Origin
- Origin: French form of Aegidius
- Region of origin: France and Francophone areas

Other names
- Related names: Giles

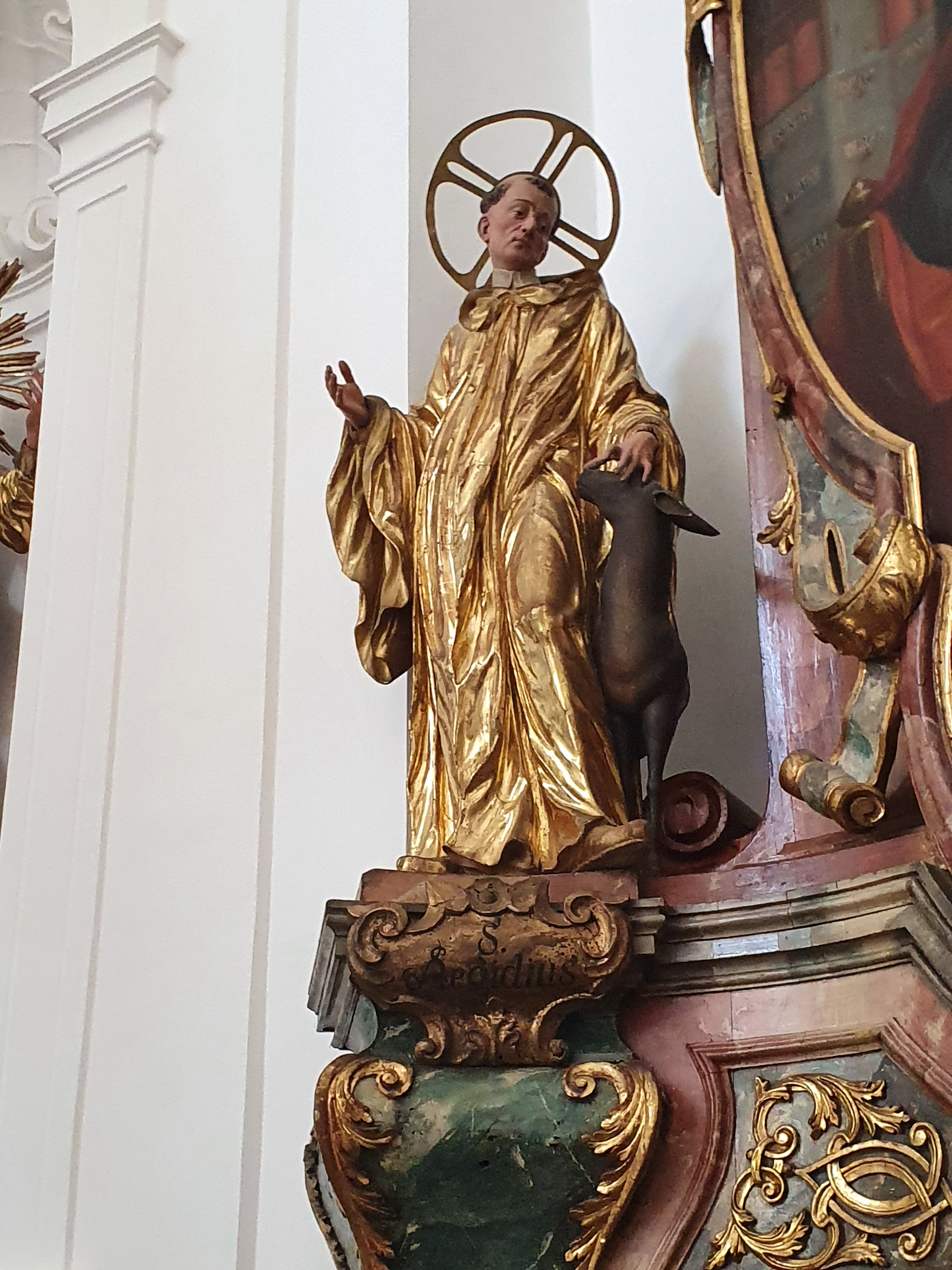
Saint Gilles, the original “Gilles”

Gilles is a French masculine given name. It is derived from that of the medieval Saint Giles.

People with the name Gilles include:

- Gilles, Count of Montaigu (fl. 12th-century), French nobleman
- Saint-Gilles (c. 650 – c. 710), Greek Christian hermit
- Gilles Aillaud (1928–2005), French painter, set decorator, and scenographer
- Gilles Alé (or Hallet; 1620–1694), Flemish painter
- Gilles Allou (1670–1751), French painter
- Gilles Andriamahazo (1919–1989), Malagasy general and political figure
- Gilles Andruet (1958–1995), French chess International Master
- Gilles Apap (born 1963), French classical violinist
- Gilles Archambault (born 1933) Canadian novelist
- Gilles Archambault (1934–2009), Canadian gridiron footballer
- Gilles Aycelin de Montaigu (13??–13??), French cardinal, bishop, and diplomat
- Gilles d'Ambra Azzopardi (born 1949), French psychosociologist
- Gilles Babinet (born 1967) French entrepreneur
- Gilles Barbier, (born 1965), Vanuatu-born French artist
- Gilles Baril (born 1940), Canadian politician
- Gilles Baril (born 1957), Canadian businessman, journalist, and politician
- Gilles Beaudoin (1919–2007), Canadian politician
- Gilles-François de Beauvais (1693 – c. 1773), French Jesuit writer and preacher
- Gilles Bellemare (1932–1980), Canadian politician
- Gilles Bellemare (born 1952), composer, conductor, and music educator
- Gilles Bensimon (born 1944), French fashion photographer
- Gilles Bernheim (born 1952), French rabbi
- Gilles Bernier (born 1934), Canadian politician and diplomat
- Gilles Bernier (born 1955), Canadian politician
- Gilles Berolatti (born 1944), French fencer
- Gilles Bertould (born 1949), French track and field athlete
- Gilles Bettmer (born 1989), Luxembourgish footballer
- Gilles Beyer (1958–2023), French figure skater
- Gilles Binchois (c. 1400 – 1460), Dutch composer
- Gilles Bisson (born 1957), Canadian politician
- Gilles Bilodeau (1955–2008), Canadian ice hockey player
- Gilles Binya (born 1984), Cameroonian footballer
- Gilles Bouchard (born 1971), Canadian ice hockey coach
- Gilles Bouleau (born 1962), French journalist
- Gilles Bourdos (born 1963), French film director, screenwriter, and producer
- Gilles Bourdouleix (born 1960), French politician
- Gilles Brassard (born 1955), Canadian cryptographer, computer scientist, and educator
- Gilles Bruckner (born 1982), Luxembourgish racing driver
- Gilles G. Brunet (1935–1984), Canadian military officer
- Gilles-Joseph-Martin Bruneteau (1760–1830), French Revolutionary and Napoleonic general
- Gilles Canouet (born 1976), French road racing cyclist
- Gilles Caouette (1940–2009), Canadian politician
- Gilles Carle (1928–2009), Canadian director, screenwriter, and painter
- Gilles Caron (1939–1970), French photographer and photojournalist
- Gilles Carpentier (1950–2016), French writer and film editor
- Gilles Carrez (born 1948), French politician
- Gilles Caussade (born 1947), French film financier and producer
- Gilles de Caux de Montlebert (c. 1682 – 1733), French poet and playwright
- Gilles Chabrier (born 19??), French astrophysicist
- Gilles Chapadeau (born 19??), Canadian politician
- Gilles Châtelet (1944–1999), French philosopher and mathematician
- Gilles Chiasson (born 1966), American film producer, director, composer, writer, and actor
- Gilles-Louis Chrétien (1754–1811), French musician
- Gilles Cioni (born 1984), French footballer
- Gilles Cistac (1961−2015), French-born Mozambican lawyer
- Gilles Colon (born 1981), Haitian-born Canadian gridiron football player
- Gilles Constantinian (born 1964), French footballer
- Gilles de Corbeil (c. 1140 – 11??) French royal physician, teacher, and poet
- Gilles Cormery (1950–1999), French poet and painter
- Gilles Corrozet (1510–1568), French writer, printer, and bookseller
- Gilles Coulier (born 1986), Belgian film director, scriptwriter, and producer
- Gilles Courteau (born 1957), Canadian ice hockey executive
- Gilles Coustellier (born 1986), French mountain bike trials cyclist
- Gilles Couturier (born 19??), Royal Canadian Navy officer
- Gilles Dambrine (born 19??), French engineer
- Gilles Dauvé (born 1947), French political theorist, school teacher, communist, and translator
- Gilles De Bilde (born 1971), Belgian footballer
- Gilles De Haes (1597–1657), Flemish military General
- Gilles Delion (born 1966), French road bicycle racer
- Gilles Delouche (1948–2020), French classical literature scholar and orientalist
- Gilles Deleuze (1925–1995), French philosopher
- Gilles Demarteau (1722–1776), Belgian-born French etcher, engraver, and publisher
- Gilles De Oliveira (born 1984), French footballer
- Gilles Domoraud (born 1979), Ivorian footballer
- Gilles Doucende (born 1977), French footballer
- Gilles Dowek (1966–2025), French computer scientist
- Gilles Duceppe (born 1947), Canadian politician, former leader of the Bloc Québécois
- Gilles Dumas (born 1962), French rugby league footballer and coach
- Gilles Échevin (born 1948), Guadeloupean-born French track and field athlete
- Gilles Elseneer (born 1978), Belgian tennis player
- Gilles Emery, (born 1962), Swiss theologian
- Gilles Engeldinger (born 1984), Luxembourgish footballer
- Gilles Epié (born 1958), French chef
- Gilles Esnault (born 19??), French painter
- Gilles Eyquem (born 1959), French footballer
- Gilles Fabien (born 1978), French Guianan footballer
- Gilles Fauconnier (1944–2021), French linguist, cognitive science researcher, and author
- Gilles Filleau des Billettes (1634–1720), French scholar, encyclopedist, and bibliographer
- Gilles Floro (1964–1999), Guadeloupean singer
- Gilles Fortin (1946–2021), Canadian politician
- Gilles Gaetner (born 1946), French journalist and author
- Gilles Garcin (1647–1702), French painter
- Gilles Gauthier (1935–2015), Canadian politician
- Gilles Gilbert (1949–2023), Canadian ice hockey player
- Gilles-Gaston Granger (1920–2016), French philosopher
- Gilles Gobeil (born 1954), Canadian electroacoustic musician
- Gilles-Lambert Godecharle (1750−1835), Belgian sculptor
- Gilles-William Goldnadel (born 1954), French-Israeli lawyer, author, and columnist
- Gilles de Gouberville (1521−1578), French diarist
- Gilles Goujon (born 1961), French chef and restaurateur
- Gilles de Gourmont (c. 1499 – 1533), French bookseller and printer
- Gilles Grangier (1911–1996), French film director and screenwriter
- Gilles Gratton (born 1952), Canadian ice hockey player
- Gilles Grégoire (1926–2006), Canadian politician, co-founder of the Parti Québécois
- Gilles Grelet (born 19??), French theorist and writer
- Gilles Grimandi (born 1970), French footballer
- Gilles Grondin (1943–2005), Canadian educator and politician
- Gilles Groulx (1931–1994), Canadian film director
- Gilles Guérin (1611–1678), French sculptor
- Gilles Guillain (born 1982), Colombian-born French actor
- Gilles Guyot (born 1946), French management professor
- Gilles Hamel (born 1960), French ice hockey player
- Gilles Hébert (born 19??), Canadian artist and museum director
- Gilles Hilary (born 19??), French accountant academic
- Gilles Hocquart (1694–1783), French Intendant of New France
- Gilles Houde (1932–2014), Canadian politician
- Gilles Jacquier (1968–2012), French photojournalist and reporter
- Gilles Jalabert (born 1958), French wrestler
- Gilles Jaquet (born 1974), Swiss snowboarder
- Gilles Joubert (1689–1775), French cabinet-maker
- Gilles Joye (1424/1425–1483), Franco-Flemish Renaissance composer
- Gilles Jullien (c. 1651/1653 – 1703), French Baroque composer and organist
- Gilles de Kerchove (born 1956), Belgian senior European Union official
- Gilles Kahn (1946–2006), French computer scientist
- Gilles Kepel (born 1955), French political scientist and Arabist
- Gilles Klopman (1933–2015), Belgian-born American chemist
- Gilles Kohler (born 1948), French actor
- Gilles Labbé (born 1948), Canadian politician
- Gilles Lalay (1962–1992) French enduro and rally raid racer
- Gilles Lamontagne (1919–2016), Canadian politician
- Gilles Lapouge (1923–2020), French writer and journalist
- Gilles Latulippe (1937–2014), Canadian actor, comedian, theatre director, and manager
- Gilles Larrain (born 1938), French-American photographer
- Gilles Lauzon, (1631–1687) French coppersmith of New France
- Gilles Le Breton (died 1553), French Renaissance architect and master-mason
- Gilles Lebreton (born 1958), French politician
- Gilles Legardinier (born 1965), French novelist
- Gilles van Ledenberg (c. 1550 – 1618), Dutch statesman
- Gilles Leger (1941–2024), Canadian ice hockey player
- Gilles Le Guen (alias Abdel Jelil; born 1955), French self-styled Islamist and jihadist
- Gilles Lehouillier (born 1953), Canadian politician civil servant
- Gilles Lellouche (born 1972), French actor
- Gilles Leroy (born 1958), French writer
- Gilles Létourneau (born 1945), Canadian attorney and judge
- Gilles le Vinier (died 1252), French medieval composer and musician
- Gilles Li Muisis (c. 1272 – 1352), French medieval chronicler and poet
- Gilles Lipovetsky (born 1944), French philosopher, writer, sociologist, and educator
- Gilles Loiselle (1929–2022), Canadian politician
- Gilles Lupien (1954–2021), Canadian sports agent and ice hockey player
- Gilles de Maistre (born 1960), French screenwriter, film director, producer, journalist, and actor
- Gilles Marceau (1928–2008), Canadian politician
- Gilles Marchal (1944–2013), French singer-songwriter
- Gilles Marchand (born 1963), French film director and screenwriter
- Gilles Marchildon (born 1965), Canadian francophone activist and LGBT activist
- Gilles Marguet (born 1967), French biathlete
- Gilles Marini (born 1976), French actor
- Gilles Marotte (1945–2005), Canadian ice hockey player
- Gilles Mayer (1929–2015), Canadian ice hockey player
- Gilles Mbang Ondo (born 1985), Gabonese footballer
- Gilles Gérard Meersseman (1903–1988), Belgian theologian and Catholic Church historian
- Gilles Meloche (born 1950), Canadian ice hockey player, coach, and scout
- Gilles Ménage (1613–1692), French scholar, philologist, lawyer, and writer
- Gilles Mimouni (born 1956), French film director
- Gilles Montezin (born 19??), French clothing designer
- Gilles Moreau (born 1945), French swimmer
- Gilles Moretton (born 1958), French tennis player
- Gilles Morin (born 1931), Canadian politician
- Gilles Motet (born 1956), French computer scientist and software engineer
- Gilles Müller (born 1983), Luxembourgish tennis player
- Gilles Mureau (c. 1450 – 1512), French Renaissance composer and singer
- Gilles Ngomo (born 1987), Cameroonian footballer
- Gilles de Noailles (1524–1600), French diplomat
- Gilles Ouimet (born 19??), Canadian politician
- Gilles Pagnon (born 1984), German rugby player
- Gilles Palsky (born 1962), French geographer and educator
- Gilles Panizzi (born 1965), French rally driver
- Gilles Paquet (1936–2019), Canadian economist
- Gilles Paquet-Brenner (born 1974), French director and screenwriter
- Gilles Pargneaux (born 1957), French politician
- Gilles de Paris (c. 1160 – 1223/1224), French medieval poet
- Gilles Pélisson (born 1957), French business executive
- Gilles Pelletier (1925–2018), Canadian actor
- Gilles Perrault (1931–2023), French writer and journalist
- Gilles Peress (born 1946), French photographer
- Gilles Perron (1940–2024), Canadian politician
- Gilles Peterson (born 1964), French disc jockey and record label owner
- Gilles Peycelon (born 1960), French footballer
- Gilles Pisier (born 1950), French mathematician
- Gilles Poisson (born 19??), Canadian wrestler
- Gilles Poitras (born 19??), Canadian anime and manga author
- Gilles Porte (born 1965), French film director, screenwriter, and cinematographer
- Gilles Potvin (1923–2000), Canadian music critic and music historian
- Gilles Pouliot (born 1942), Canadian politician
- Gilles Poux (born 1957), French politician
- Gilles Pudlowski (born 1950), French journalist, writer, literary and gastronomic critic
- Gilles Quénéhervé (born 1966), French sprinter
- Gilles Quispel (1916–2006), Dutch theologian and historian of Christianity and Gnosticism
- Gilles de Rais (c. 1405 – 1440), French nobleman, knight, and serial killer of children
- Gilles Rampillon (born 1953), French footballer
- Gilles Reingot (c. 1501 – 1530), Franco-Flemish Renaissance composer
- Gilles Robert (born 1955), Canadian politician
- Gilles de Roberval (1602–1675), French mathematician
- Gilles de Robien (born 1941), French politician
- Gilles Roch (born 1952), Canadian politician
- Gilles Rocheleau (1935–1998), Canadian politician
- Gilles Rondy (born 1981), French swimmer
- Gilles Rousselet (1610–1686), French engraver
- Gilles Rousset (born 1963), French footballer
- Gilles Roussi (born 1947), French sculptor
- Gilles Roux (born 1971), French speedcuber
- Gilles de Roye (died 1478), Flemish chronicler
- Gilles Ruyssen (born 1994), Belgian footballer
- Gilles Ste-Croix (born 19??), Canadian entrepreneur and vice president and co-creator of Cirque du Soleil
- Gilles Saint-Paul (born 1963), French economist
- Gilles Salles (born 19??), French oncologist and cancer researcher
- Gilles Samoun (born 19??), French entrepreneur
- Gilles Sanders (born 1964), French racing cyclist
- Gilles Savary (born 1954), French politician
- Gilles Schey (c. 1644 – 1703), Dutch Navy admiral
- Gilles Schnepp (born 1958), French business executive
- Gilles Ségal (1929–2014), French actor, mime, and playwright
- Gilles-Éric Séralini (born 1960), French molecular biologist, political advisor, and anti-GMO activist
- Gilles Servat (born 1945), French singer-songwriter
- Gilles Simeoni (born 1967), Corsican politician
- Gilles Simon (born 1958), French Formula One racing driver
- Gilles Simon (born 1984), French tennis player
- Gilles de Souvré (c. 1540 – 1626), French nobleman and military officer
- Gilles Sunu (born 1991), French footballer
- Gilles Taillon (born 1945), Canadian politician
- Gilles Talmant (born 1970), French racing cyclist
- Gilles Terral (1943–1998), French entomologist
- Gilles Tetreault (born 19??), Canadian attempted murder victim
- Gilles Thibaudeau (born 1963), Canadian ice hockey player
- Gilles Thomas (writer) (1929–1985), French science fiction writer
- Gilles Tonelli (born 1957), Monegasque engineer, diplomat and politician
- Gilles de Toucy (died c. 1139–1142), French medieval cardinal-bishop
- Georges Gilles de la Tourette (1857–1904), French physician and namesake of Tourette's syndrome
- Gilles Tran (born 19??), French 3D artist
- Gilles Tréhin (born 1972), French artist and author
- Gilles Tremblay (1932–2017), Canadian composer
- Gilles Tremblay (1938–2014), Canadian ice hockey player
- Gilles Turcot (1917–2010), Canadian Armed Forces General
- Gilles Vaillancourt (born 1941), former Canadian politician
- Gilles Valiquette (born 1952), Canadian rock musician
- Gilles Van Assche (born 19??), Belgian cryptographer
- Gilles Veissière (born 1959), French football referee
- Gilles Verdez (born 1964), French sports journalist, television and radio columnist
- Gilles Verlant (1957–2013), Belgian journalist and music critic
- Gilles Vidal (born c. 1972), French automobile designer
- Gilles Vigne (born 1950), French swimmer
- Gilles Vigneault (born 1928), Canadian poet, publisher, and singer-songwriter
- Gilles Villemure (born 1940), Canadian ice hockey player
- Gilles Villeneuve (1950–1982), Canadian racing driver
- Gilles Vincent (born 1958), French crime fiction author
- Gilles Yapi Yapo (born 1982), Ivorian footballer
- Gilles Zolty (born 19??), Canadian musician, singer-songwriter, and music producer

== Fictional people ==
- Gilles, a stock character of French farce and Commedia dell'arte

== See also ==
- Gilles (surname)
