= Giles (given name) =

- Pronunciation: French: [ʒil]
- Gender: masculine

Origin
- Origin: French form of Aegidius
- Region of origin: medieval France

Other names
- Related names: Égide, Gilles, Jiles, Jyles

Giles (/dʒaɪlz/ JYLZE) or Gyles is a masculine given name. It is the Medieval English form of the name of the French hermit Saint Giles, which itself is the Old French form of the Latin name Aegidius. The modern French forms are Gilles and the less common Égide. Some languages have their own variations of the name, for example Tilen in Slovene.

== Notable people with the given name ==
- Saint Giles, 7th/8th-century Christian hermit saint
- Alfred Giles, several people
- Giles Alington, several people
- Giles Andreae (born 1966), British writer and illustrator
- Giles of Assisi, Aegidius of Assisi, 13th-century companion of St. Francis of Assisi
- Giles of Rome, 13th-century archbishop
- Giles Barnes (born 1988), English footballer
- Giles Leonard Barrett (c. 1744–1809), English actor
- Giles Blunt (born 1952), Canadian novelist and screenwriter
- Giles Brindley (born 1926), British physiologist, musicologist and composer
- Giles Brook (c. 1553–1614), English politician
- Giles Brydges, several people
- Giles Chichester (born 1946), British Conservative Party politician
- Giles Clark, English conservationist and TV presenter
- Giles Clarke (born 1953), British businessman then cricket administrator
- Giles Coke (born 1986), English professional footballer and coach
- Giles Cooper, several people
- Giles Coren (born 1969), British journalist
- Giles Corey (1621–1692), victim of the Salem witch trials
- Giles Daubeney, several people
- Giles Deacon (born 1969), British fashion designer
- Giles Duley (born 1971), English photographer, chef, writer, CEO and presenter
- Giles Fletcher, the Elder (c. 1548–1611), English poet, politician, and diplomat
- Giles Fraser (born 1964), English Anglican priest and broadcaster
- Giles Goddard (born 1962), British Church of England priest
- Giles Goddard (video game programmer) (born 1971), English video game programmer
- Giles Gordon (1940–2003), Scottish literary agent and writer
- Giles B. Harber (1849–1925), American United States Navy admiral
- Giles Henderson (born 1942), Master of Pembroke College, Oxford
- Giles W. Hotchkiss (1815–1878), American attorney and politician
- Giles Hussey (painter) (1710–1788), English painter
- Giles Hussey (tennis) (born 1997), British tennis player
- Giles Jackson (born 2001), American football player
- Giles Beecher Jackson (1853–1924), African-American lawyer, newspaper publisher, entrepreneur, and civil rights activist
- Giles Kristian (born 1975), British author
- Giles Mackay (born 1961/1962), British businessman and property investor
- Giles Martin (born 1969), English record producer and songwriter
- Giles Matthey (born 1987), British actor
- Giles Milton (born 1966), British writer and historian
- Giles Mompesson (c. 1583 – 1663), English politician
- Giles Pellerin (1906–1998), American businessman
- Giles Portman, British diplomat
- Giles Radice, Baron Radice (1936–2022), British politician
- Giles Rich (1904–1999), American judge
- Giles Rooke (1743–1808), English judge
- Giles Gilbert Scott (1880–1960), British architect
- Giles Scott-Smith, Dutch-British political researcher
- Giles Smith, several people
- Giles Strangways (died 1546), MP
- Giles Strangways (1528–1562), MP
- Giles E. Strangways (1819–1906), pioneer settler of South Australia
- Giles Terera, British actor and singer
- Giles Ji Ungpakorn (born 1953), Thai academic and Marxist political activist
- Giles Watling (born 1953), British actor and politician
- Giles Worsley (1961–2006), English architectural historian
- Giles Yeo, American-British biologist

== Fictional characters ==
- Farmer Giles of Ham, the title character of the comic fable by J. R. R. Tolkien
- Giles Habibula, a character in the Legion of Space Series by Jack Williamson
- Giles Wemmbley-Hogg of British radio comedy Giles Wemmbley-Hogg Goes Off
- Giles Ralston, one of the main characters of Agatha Christie's play, The Mousetrap
- Giles family, fictional British family created by cartoonist Carl Giles at the end of World War II
- Sir Giles Over-reach, the villain in the English Renaissance drama, A New Way to Pay Old Debts
- Giles French, a fictional character in the American sitcom, Family Affair
- Giles Mercier, a fictional character in the 2012 American action thriller film, Alex Cross
- Giles Winslow Jr, a fictional character in the 2018 film, Christopher Robin

== See also ==
- Egidio
- Giles (disambiguation)
- Giles (surname)
- Gilles (given name)
- Gyles, a list of people with the given name or surname
- Gyles v Wilcox
- Saint Giles
- Tilen, Slovenian version of the name
- All pages beginning with Giles
