= Aegidius (given name) =

Aegidius (given name) is a male given name of Greek origin.

Aegidius (died 464 or 465) was a magister militum in Gaul.

== Variations ==
- Tilen: Slovene
- Egidijus: Lithuanian
- Giles: English
- Gilles: French

== Bearers ==
Bearers of the variants Aegidius, Ægidius, or Egidius include:

=== Pre-modern era ===
Chronological order

- Aegidius (c. early 5th century–464/465) Magister militum in Gaul, ruler of the Kingdom of Soissons
- Saint Aegidius or Saint Giles (c. 650–c. 710), hermit saint from Athens
- Aegidius Corboliensis or Gilles de Corbeil (c. 1140–first quarter of the 13th century), physician
- Egidius Parisiensis (c. 1160–1223/1224), French poet
- Egidius Smaragd (fl. c. 1185–1215), Hungarian noble of French origin
- Aegidius of Assisi (c. 1190–1262), one of the original companions of saint Francis of Assisi
- Egidius Monoszló (c. 1240–1313), Hungarian baron
- Aegidius de Lessinia (died c. 1304), scholastic philosopher, pupil of Thomas Aquinas
- Aegidius Romanus or Giles of Rome (c. 1243–1316), archbishop of Bourges and philosopher
- Egidius de Francia or Egidius de Murino (fl. mid 14th century), sometimes Magister Frater Egidius, French composer and music theorist in Italy
- Egidius (Chantilly Codex composer) (c. 1350–1400), sometimes Magister Egidius, composer in the Chantilly Codex
- Egidius Cantoris (fl. 1410–1411), one of the two leaders of the Men of Understanding, a heretical sect
- Aegidius Campensis or Gilles Deschamps (fl. 1411 and 1431), bishop of Coutances present at the trial of Joan of Arc, teacher of Jean Gerson
- Egidius Binchois, usually known as Gilles Binchois (c. 1400–1460), Franco-Flemish composer
- Aegidius of Viterbo or Aegidius Canisius (1472–1532), Italian cardinal, theologian, orator, humanist and poet

=== Modern era ===
Alphabetical order by last name

- Egidius Braun (born 1925), president of the Deutscher Fußball-Bund
- Aegidius Bucherius (1576–1665), French Jesuit and chronological scholar
- Ægidius Elling (1861–1949), Norwegian inventor
- Aegidius Gelenius (1595–1656), Cologne historian
- Aegidius Hunnius (1550–1603), Lutheran theologian
- Egidius Junger (1833–1895), German-born bishop of Nesqually
- Egidius Juška (born 1975), retired Lithuanian soccer player
- Aegidius Rousselet (1610–1686), also known as Gilles Rousselet, French engraver
- Aegidius Sadeler (c. 1570–1629), Flemish baroque era painter and engraver
- Egidius Slanghen (1820–1882), mayor of Hoensbroek, Netherlands
- Aegidius Tschudi (1505–1572), Swiss writer

== See also ==
- Egidio, a list of people with the given name
- Egide, a list of people with the given name
