= Egide =

Egide or Égide is a masculine given name which may refer to:

- Égide de Boeck (1875–1944), Belgian Catholic priest, bishop, Apostolic Vicar and linguist in the then Belgian Congo
- Egide Duny or Egidio Duni (1708–1775), Italian opera composer
- Egide Fologne (1830–1919), Belgian entomologist
- Egide François Leemans (1839–1883), Belgian painter, draughtsman and engraver
- Egide Linnig (1821–1860), Belgian painter, draughtsman and engraver
- Egide Ntakarutimana (born 1997), Burundian long-distance runner
- Egide Nzojibwami, Burundian geologist and academic, first Burundian member of the Church of Jesus Christ of Latter-day Saints
- Égide Rombaux (1865–1942), Belgian sculptor
- Egide Walschaerts (1820–1901), Belgian mechanical engineer and inventor
- Egide Charles Gustave, Baron Wappers or Gustave Wappers (1803–1874), Belgian painter

== See also ==
- Egidio
