= Geelen =

Geelen (Dutch pronunciation: [ˈɣeːlə(n)]) is a surname most common in Belgian and Dutch Limburg. In most instances it has a patronymic origin, where Geel was a variant of Giel, itself a short form of either Aegidius, Gilbert or Michiel. Notable people with this name include:

- Guido Geelen (born 1961), Dutch sculptor, furniture designer and ceramist
- Harrie Geelen (1939–2025), Dutch illustrator, film director, animator, translator, writer and poet
- Jim Geelen (born c.1971), Canadian mathematician and combinatorialist
- Pie Geelen (born 1972), Dutch freestyle swimmer
- Pieter Geelen (born 1964), Dutch inventor and entrepreneur, founder of TomTom

== See also ==
- Gielen, surname of the same origin
