= Giles =

Giles may refer to:

== People ==
- Giles (given name), including a list of people and fictional characters
- Giles (surname), a list of people and fictional characters
- Saint Giles (650–710), Christian hermit saint
- Giles of Assisi (c. 1190–1262), a companion of St. Francis of Assisi
- Giles of Rome (1243–1316), Italian philosopher and Catholic archbishop
- Carl Giles (1916–1995), British cartoonist for the Daily Express known simply as "Giles"

== Places ==
=== Australia ===
- Electoral district of Giles, a state electoral district in South Australia
- Giles Weather Station near the Western Australian - South Australian border
- Giles Land District, a land district (cadastral division) of Western Australia

=== United States ===
- Giles, Mississippi
- Giles, Utah, a ghost town
- Giles, West Virginia, an unincorporated community
- Giles County, Tennessee
- Giles County, Virginia

== Arts and entertainment ==
- Giles (Buffy comic), a story based on the Buffy the Vampire Slayer television series
- "Giles", a solo electronica side-project of Tommy Giles Rogers, Jr. who is the frontman for the metal band Between the Buried and Me
- "Giles", a song by Unearth from III: In the Eyes of Fire

== Other uses ==
- Giles G-202, an aerobatic plane designed by Richard Giles
- Giles (bacteriophage), a virus infecting the bacterial species Mycobacterium smegmatis

== See also ==
- Gyles, a list of people with the given name or surname
- Gilles (disambiguation)
