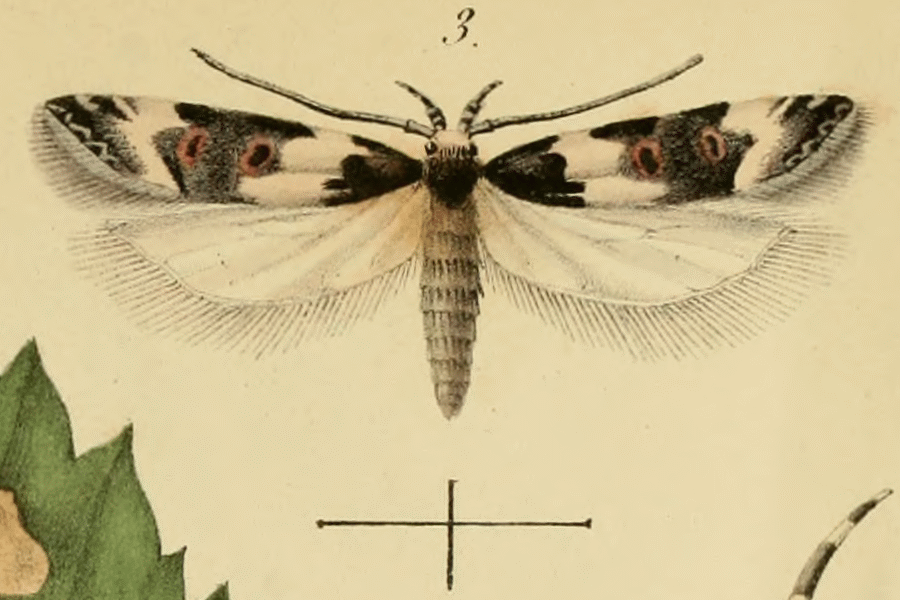

Scientific classification
- Domain: Eukaryota
- Kingdom: Animalia
- Phylum: Arthropoda
- Class: Insecta
- Order: Lepidoptera
- Family: Gelechiidae
- Genus: Teleiopsis
- Species: T. rosalbella

Binomial name
- Teleiopsis rosalbella (E. Fologne, 1862)

Synonyms
- Gelechia rosalbella Fologne, 1862

= Teleiopsis rosalbella =

Species of moth

Teleiopsis rosalbella is a moth of the family Gelechiidae. It is locally distributed in central and south-eastern Europe. Its range extends from Belgium to Bosnia-Herzegovina. It is also present in Turkey. It is found on altitudes from 140 to 1,400 meters.

The wingspan is 16–18 mm. Adults are on wing from June to September.

The larvae feed on Rumex scutatus. They mine the leaves of their host plant.
