= Giel =

Giel may refer to:

== Given name ==
- Giel Beelen (born 1977), Dutch radio DJ and presenter
- Giel Deferm (born 1988), Belgian footballer

== Surname ==
- Anthony Giel (born 1964), Arubahuis worker
- Antonio Giel (born 1981), Aruban footballer
- Paul Giel (1932–2002), Minnesotan baseball player
- Paweł Giel (born 1989), Polish footballer
- Rosanna Giel (born 1992), Cuban volleyball player
- Frans Van Giel (1892–1975), Belgian painter

== Place ==
- Giel-Courteilles, a commune of Normandy, France

== See also ==
- Geil (disambiguation)
