= Gillese =

Gillese is a surname. Notable people with the surname include:

- Eileen E. Gillese, Canadian judge
- John Patrick Gillese (1920–1999), Irish-born Canadian author
- Kevin Gillese (born 1980), Canadian actor, writer, and improvisor

== See also ==
- Gilles (given name)
