= Gielen =

Gielen (Dutch pronunciation: [ˈɣilə(n)]) is a Dutch and Low German patronymic surname most common in Belgian and Dutch Limburg. The given name Giel is a short form of either Michiel, Gilbert or Aegidius. Variant forms are Giele and Gielens. Notable people with this name include:

- Frans Gielen (1921–2004), Belgian racing cyclist
- Johan Gielen (born 1968), Belgian-born, Dutch trance artist, DJ, and remixer
- Jos Gielen (1898–1981), Dutch politician and literary historian
- Michael Gielen (1927–2019), Austrian conductor
- Stan Gielen (born 1952), Dutch biophysicist, chairman of the NWO

Giele

- Adolf Giele (1929–2002), German handball player and coach
- Ferdinand Giele (1867–1929), Belgian painter and engraver
- Janet Zollinger Giele (born 1934), American sociologist
- Louis H. Giele (1861–1932), German-born, American architect

== See also ==
- Geelen, surname of the same origin
