= Egidijus =

Egidijus is a Lithuanian masculine given name. It is a cognate of the English language name Giles.

== List of people named Egidijus ==
- Egidijus Balčiūnas (born 1975), Lithuanian sprint canoer
- Egidijus Bičkauskas (born 1955), Lithuanian politician, jurist
- Egidijus Dimša (born 1985), Lithuanian basketball player
- Egidijus Jarašiūnas (born 1952), Lithuanian lawyer
- Egidijus Juška (born 1975), Lithuanian footballer
- Egidijus Kavaliauskas (born 1988), Lithuanian boxer who competed in the 2008 Olympics
- Egidijus Klumbys (born 1952), Lithuanian politician
- Egidijus Kūris (born 1961), Lithuanian professor and PhD in law
- Egidijus Majus (born 1984), Lithuanian footballer currently playing for PFK Dinamo Samarqand
- Egidijus Mockevičius (born 1992), Lithuanian basketball player
- Egidijus Vaitkūnas (born 1988), Lithuanian footballer
- Egidijus Valavičius (born 1978), Lithuanian mixed martial artist from Vilnius
- Egidijus Varnas (born 1975), Lithuanian football forward currently playing for FK Ekranas
- Egidijus Žilinskas (born 1986), Lithuanian judoka
