= Le Guen =

Le Guen is Breton surname, the word comes from gwenn, meaning white or blessed (figurative meaning) in Breton. Notable people with the surname include:

- Gilles Le Guen (born 1955), French jihadist
- Jacques Le Guen (1958–2025), member of the National Assembly of France
- Jean-Marie Le Guen (born 1953), member of the National Assembly of France
- Paul Le Guen (born 1964), French former international football defender and coach

== See also ==
- Saint-Guen
- Ursula K. Le Guin
