= Teleiopsis albifemorella =

Scientific classification
- Domain: Eukaryota
- Kingdom: Animalia
- Phylum: Arthropoda
- Class: Insecta
- Order: Lepidoptera
- Family: Gelechiidae
- Genus: Teleiopsis
- Species: T. albifemorella

Binomial name
- Teleiopsis albifemorella (E. Hofmann, 1867)

Synonyms
- Gelechia albifemorella Hofmann, 1867

Species of moth

Teleiopsis albifemorella is a moth of the family Gelechiidae. It is found in the southern and northern parts of the Alps. It is also found in the Spanish Pyrenees and the mountains of the Abruzzo region in Italy and in former Serbia and Montenegro.

The wingspan is 19–23 mm. Adults are on wing in July to September.

The larvae feed on Rumex scutatus.
