= Lauzon (surname) =

Lauzon is a French surname with significant usage in Canada.

== Notable people ==
- Craig Lauzon (born 1971), Canadian actor
- Dan Lauzon (born 1988), American MMA fighter
- Edythe Morahan de Lauzon, Canadian poet
- Gilles Lauzon (1631–1687), French coppersmith
- Guy Lauzon (born 1944), Canadian politician
- Jack M. Lauzon (born 1961), Canadian horse racing jockey
- Jani Lauzon (born 1959), Canadian puppeteer and musician
- Jason Lauzon (born 1990), Canadian football player
- Jean-Baptiste Lauzon (1858–1944), Canadian politician
- Jean-Claude Lauzon (1953–1997), Canadian filmwriter
- Jean de Lauzon (1586–1666), French lawyer and governor of New France
- Jérémy Lauzon (born 1997), Canadian ice hockey defenceman
- Joe Lauzon (born 1984), American MMA fighter
- Léo-Paul Lauzon (born 1946), Canadian professor
- Patrice Lauzon (born 1975), Canadian ice dancing coach
- Pierre de Lauzon (1687–1742), French missionary
- Stéphane Lauzon (born 1966), Canadian politician
