= Gilles (disambiguation) =

The Gilles are the primary group of participants in the Carnival of Binche.

Gilles may also refer to:

== People ==
- Gilles (given name), a list of people with the given name
- Gilles (surname), a list of people with the surname
- Stage name of Jean Villard (1895–1982) as part of the Swiss cabaret duo "Gilles et Julien"

== Arts and entertainment ==
- Gilles (novel), a 1939 novel by Pierre Drieu La Rochelle
- Gilles (stock character), French stock character of farce and commedia dell'arte
- Gilles (2008 film), a Canadian short drama film directed by Constant Mentzas

== Other uses ==
- Gilles, Eure-et-Loir, a town in France

== See also ==
- Giles (disambiguation)
