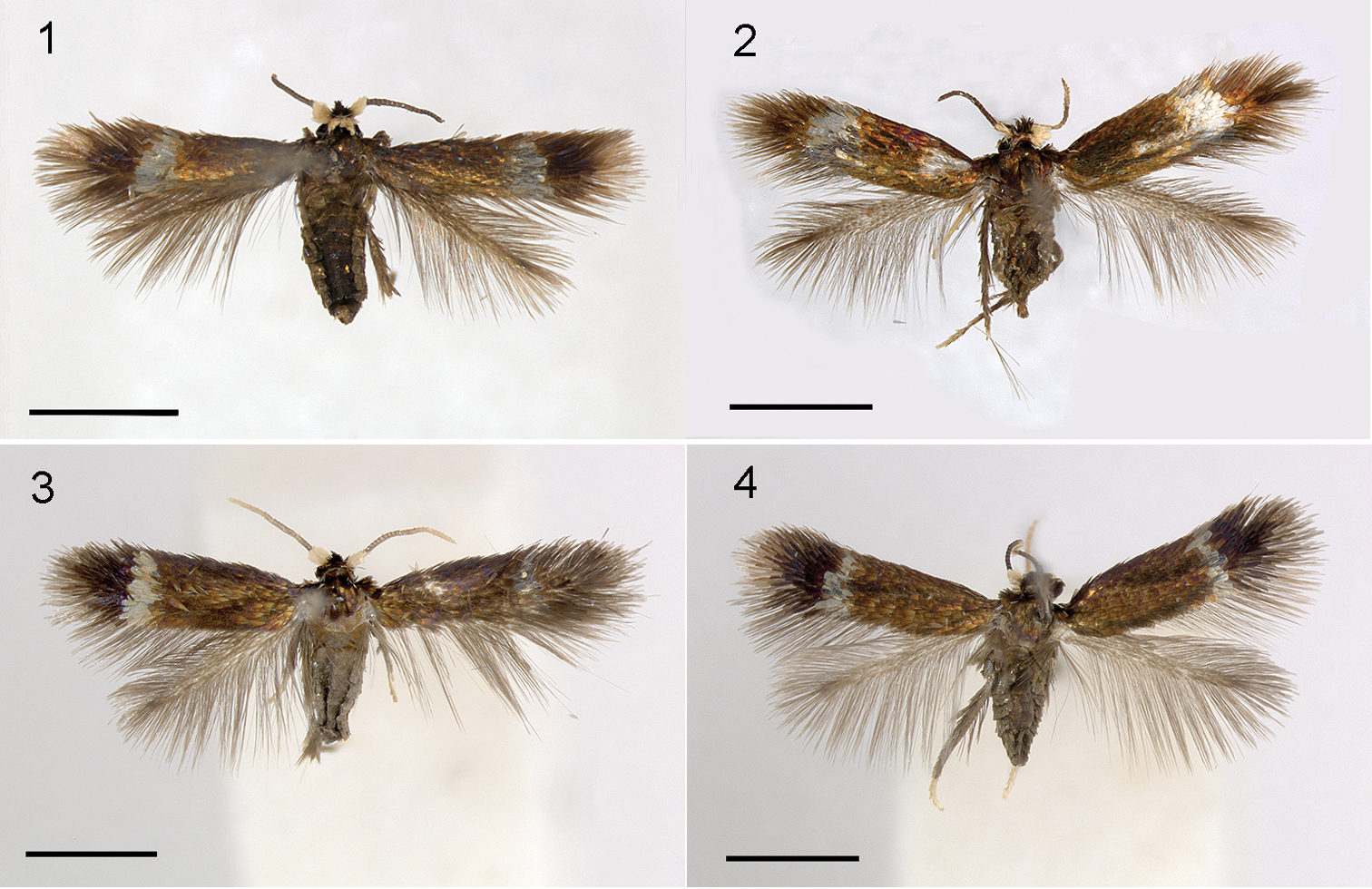
- fig. 3 male fig. 4 female.
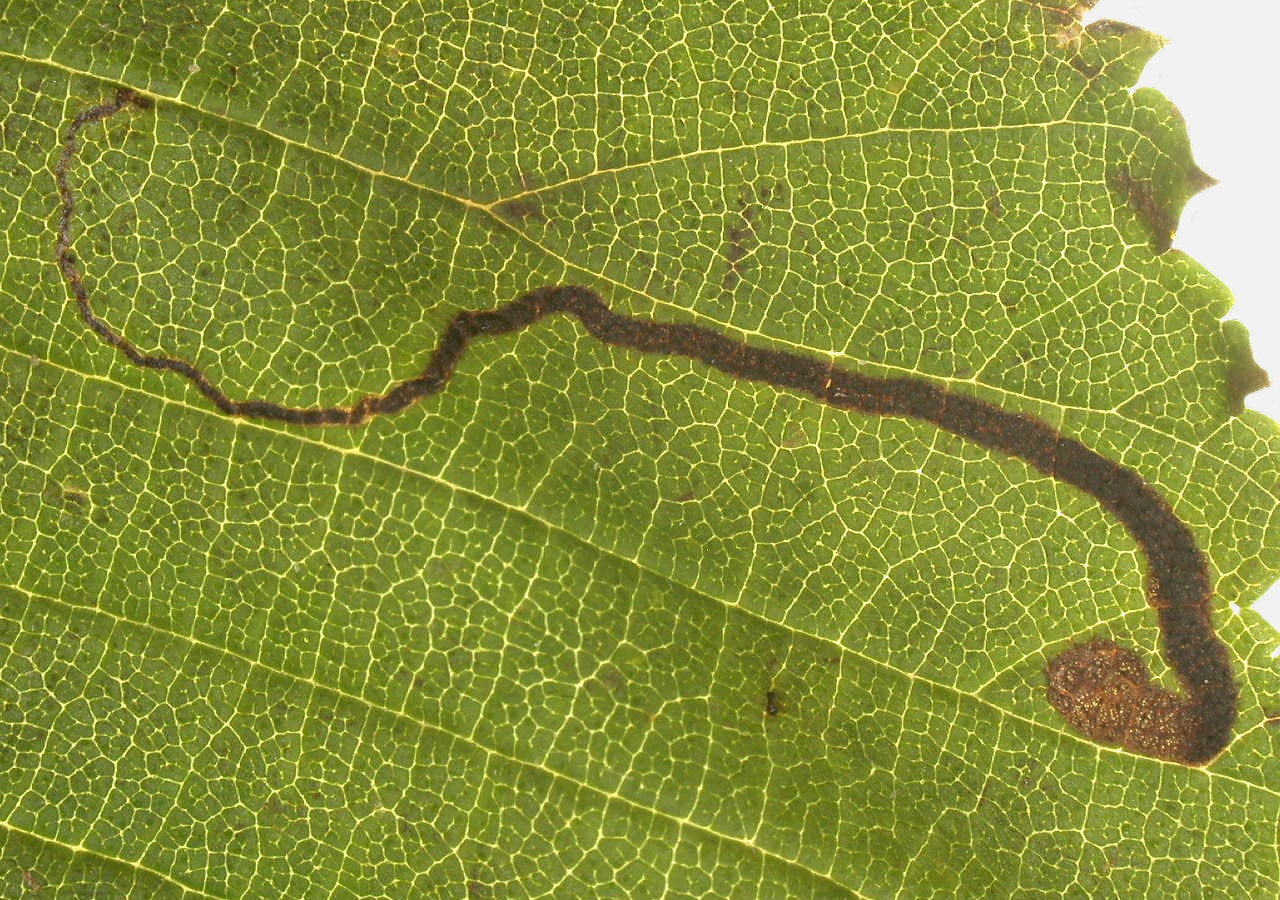

Scientific classification
- Kingdom: Animalia
- Phylum: Arthropoda
- Clade: Pancrustacea
- Class: Insecta
- Order: Lepidoptera
- Family: Nepticulidae
- Genus: Stigmella
- Species: S. ulmivora

Binomial name
- Stigmella ulmivora (Fologne, 1860)

Synonyms
- Nepticula ulmivora Fologne, 1860; Nepticula ulmicola Hering, 1932; Nepticula ulmifoliae Hering, 1931

= Stigmella ulmivora =

Species of moth

Stigmella ulmivora is a moth of the family Nepticulidae. It is found in all of Europe, except the Balkan Peninsula.

== Description ==
The wingspan is 4–5 millimetres (0.16–0.20 in). The thick erect hairs on the head vertex are black. The collar is black. The antennal eyecaps are white. The forewings are shining dark coppery-golden, costa deep purple with a shining silvery fascia beyond middle. The apical area beyond this is deep purple-fuscous. The hindwings are rather dark. External image

Adults are usually on wing in May in one generation, but there might be a second generation depending on the location.

== Ecology ==
The larvae feed on Ulmus glabra, Ulmus laevis, Ulmus minor and Ulmus pumila.
