= Teleiopsis brevivalva =

Scientific classification
- Domain: Eukaryota
- Kingdom: Animalia
- Phylum: Arthropoda
- Class: Insecta
- Order: Lepidoptera
- Family: Gelechiidae
- Genus: Teleiopsis
- Species: T. brevivalva

Binomial name
- Teleiopsis brevivalva Pitkin, 1988

Species of moth

Teleiopsis brevivalva is a moth of the family Gelechiidae. It is found in India.

The larvae feed on Juglans regia from within rolled leaves.
