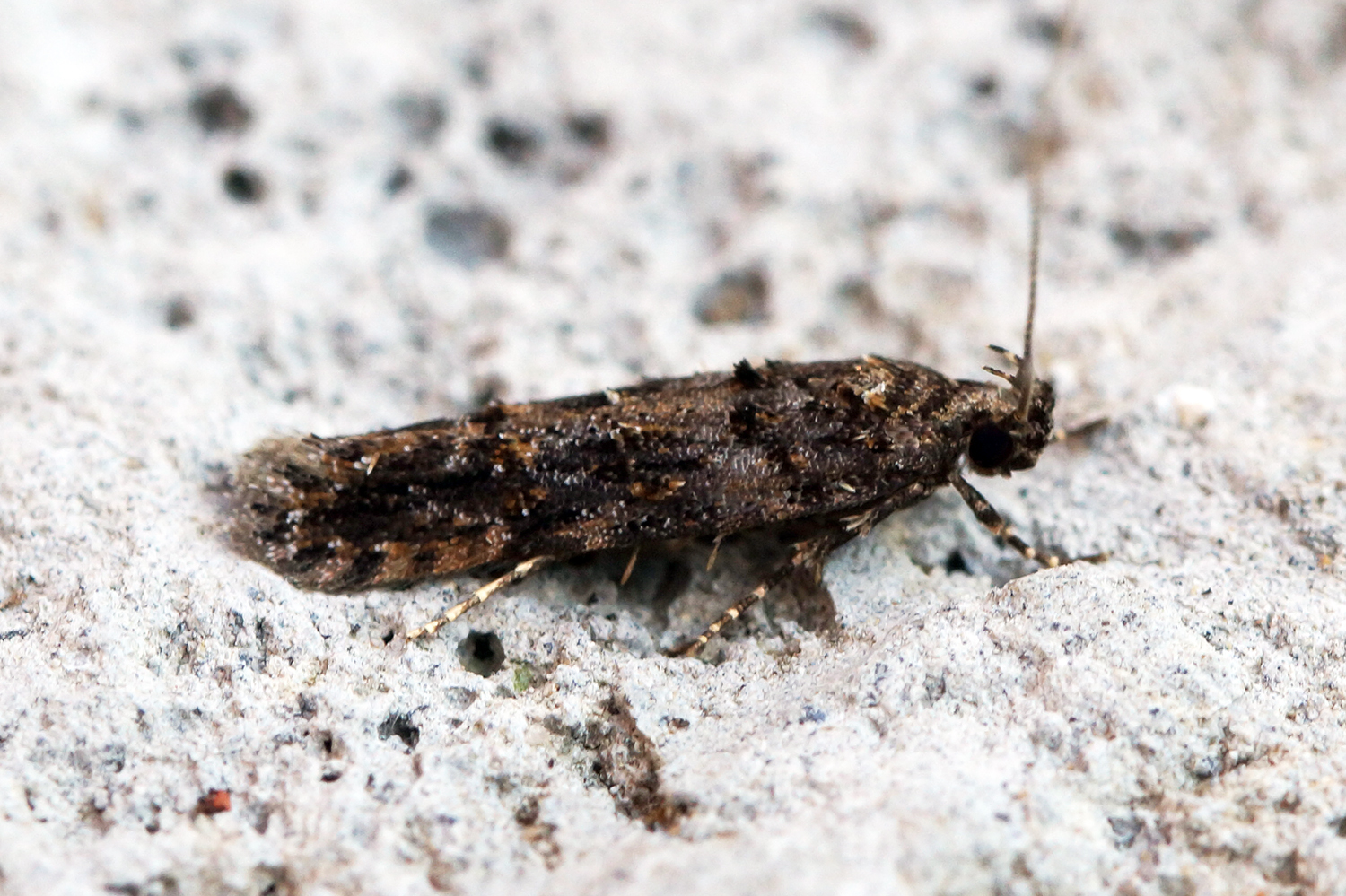

Scientific classification
- Kingdom: Animalia
- Phylum: Arthropoda
- Clade: Pancrustacea
- Class: Insecta
- Order: Lepidoptera
- Family: Gelechiidae
- Genus: Teleiopsis
- Species: T. diffinis

Binomial name
- Teleiopsis diffinis (Haworth, 1828)

Synonyms
- Recurvaria diffinis Haworth, 1828; Lita dissimilella Treitschke, 1833; Gelechia scabidella Zeller, 1839; Lita friesella Zetterstedt, 1839; Gelechia diffinella Doubleday, 1859; Gelechia diffinis ab. groenliensis Strand, 1920

= Teleiopsis diffinis =

Species of moth

Teleiopsis diffinis is a moth of the family Gelechiidae. It is found in Europe, North Africa, the Near East, central Asia and Siberia (Transbaikalia).

The wingspan is 13–18 mm. Terminal joint of palpi as long as second. Forewings are ochreous-brownish, violet- tinged, more or less densely irrorated with blackish and whitish; an angulated oblique fascia of three violet-black raised marks about 1/4; stigmata blackish, first discal slightly beyond plical, second forming a transverse mark or pair of dots; an indistinct pale angulated fascia at 3/4, preceded by dark costal and dorsal spots. Hindwings over 1, grey. The larva is brownish-green, reddish-marbled; head and plate of 2 yellow-brown.

Adults are on wing from May to August. There are two generations per year.

The larvae feed on Rumex acetosella and Rumex crispus.
