= Teleiopsis bagriotella =

Scientific classification
- Kingdom: Animalia
- Phylum: Arthropoda
- Clade: Pancrustacea
- Class: Insecta
- Order: Lepidoptera
- Family: Gelechiidae
- Genus: Teleiopsis
- Species: T. bagriotella

Binomial name
- Teleiopsis bagriotella (Duponchel, 1840)

Synonyms
- Anacampsis bagriotella Duponchel, [1840]; Teleiopsis elatella (Herrich-Schäffer, 1853); Gelechia elatella Herrich-Schäffer, 1854

Species of moth

Teleiopsis bagriotella is a moth of the family Gelechiidae. It is found in the mountainous areas of Europe, from Portugal and Spain to Greece. In the north it is found up to the Tatra Mountains. Outside Europe it is also found in Turkey. It is found at heights between 1,200 and 3,000 meters.

The wingspan is 17–22 mm. Adults are on wing in June to October.

The larvae feed on Oxyria digyna.
