= Jiles =

Jiles is a given name and surname. Notable people with the name include:

== Given name ==
- Jiles Perry Richardson Jr. (1930–1959), American musician better known as The Big Bopper

== Surname ==
- David Jiles, British engineer and academic who researched the Jiles-Atherton model of magnetic hysteresis
- Dwayne Jiles (born 1961), former professional American football player
- John Jiles (born 2000), American football player
- Pamela Jiles (born 1954), American sprinter
- Pamela Jiles (born 1960), Chilean journalist and politician
- Paulette Jiles (1943–2025), American poet, memoirist, and novelist

== See also ==
- Giles (given name)
- Giles (surname)
- Jyles
