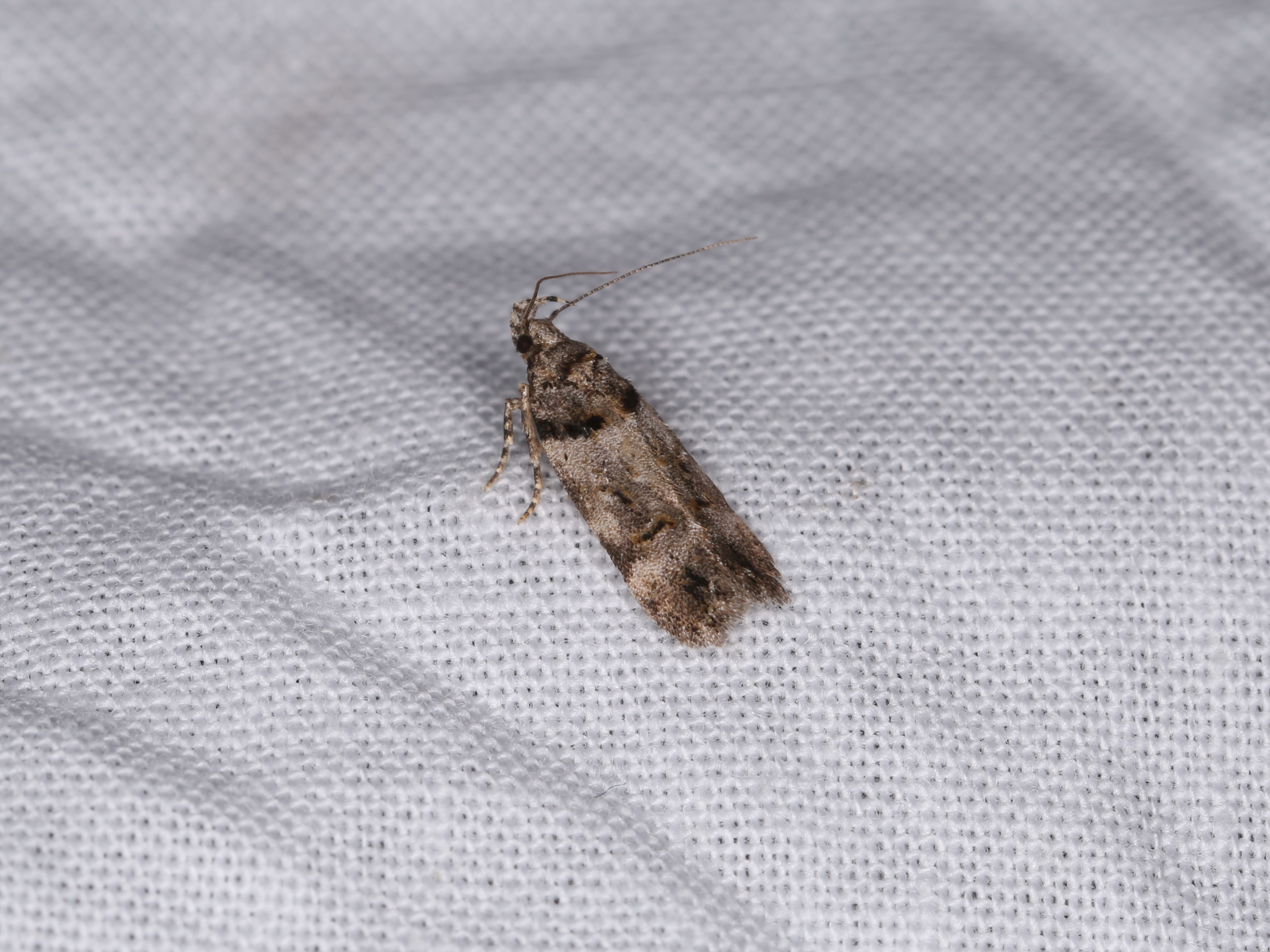

Scientific classification
- Domain: Eukaryota
- Kingdom: Animalia
- Phylum: Arthropoda
- Class: Insecta
- Order: Lepidoptera
- Family: Gelechiidae
- Genus: Teleiopsis
- Species: T. baldiana

Binomial name
- Teleiopsis baldiana (Barnes & Busck, 1920)

Synonyms
- Telphusa baldiana Barnes & Busck, 1920

= Teleiopsis baldiana =

Species of moth

Teleiopsis baldiana is a moth of the family Gelechiidae described by William Barnes and August Busck in 1920. It is found in North America, where it has been recorded from California.

The wingspan is 19–21 mm. The forewings are bluish white, overlaid with fuscous, black and brown scales and with a rather well defined outwardly oblique fasciae of black raised scales from near the base of the costa to the basal fourth of the dorsum. There is an ill-defined light fuscous spot on the middle of costa, as well as an ill-defined transverse shade of fuscous over the end of the cell, edged exteriorly by a narrow nearly unmottled white fascia. There is also a short transverse streak of black-and-brown raised scales at the end of the cell and the tip of the wing is overlaid with fuscous.

The larvae feed on Toxicodendron diversilobum. They roll the leaves of their host plant.
