= Teleiopsis insignita =

Scientific classification
- Domain: Eukaryota
- Kingdom: Animalia
- Phylum: Arthropoda
- Class: Insecta
- Order: Lepidoptera
- Family: Gelechiidae
- Genus: Teleiopsis
- Species: T. insignita

Binomial name
- Teleiopsis insignita Pitkin, 1988

Species of moth

Teleiopsis insignita is a moth of the family Gelechiidae. It was described by Pitkin in 1988. It is found in the Palearctic realm.
