= Teleiopsis tchukotka =

Scientific classification
- Domain: Eukaryota
- Kingdom: Animalia
- Phylum: Arthropoda
- Class: Insecta
- Order: Lepidoptera
- Family: Gelechiidae
- Genus: Teleiopsis
- Species: T. tchukotka

Binomial name
- Teleiopsis tchukotka Bidzilya, 2012

Species of moth

Teleiopsis tchukotka is a moth of the family Gelechiidae. It is found in the Russian Far East, where it has been recorded from the Chukotka Autonomous Okrug.
