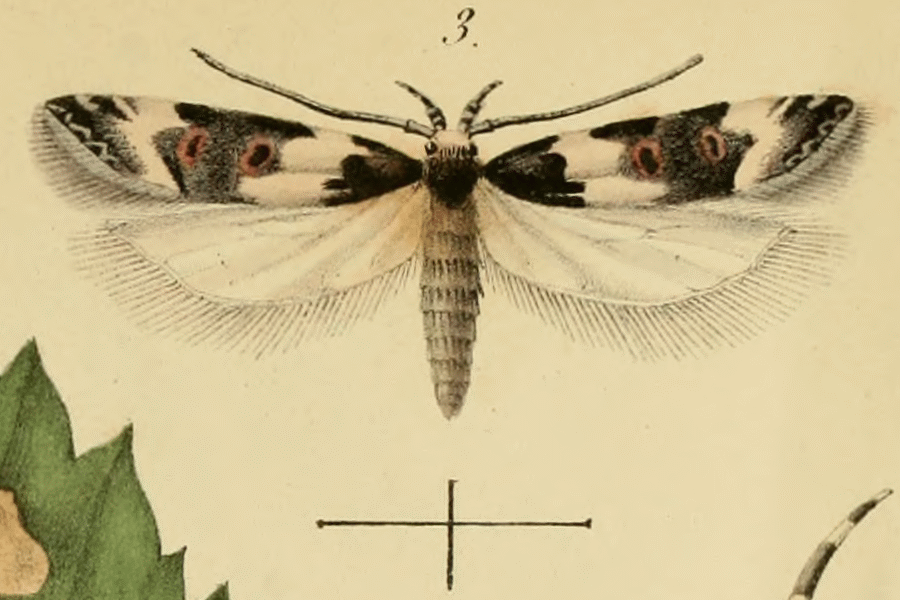
- Teleiopsis rosalbella

Scientific classification
- Kingdom: Animalia
- Phylum: Arthropoda
- Class: Insecta
- Order: Lepidoptera
- Family: Gelechiidae
- Tribe: Litini
- Genus: Teleiopsis; Sattler, 1960

= Teleiopsis =

Genus of moths

Teleiopsis is a genus of moths of the family Gelechiidae.

== Range ==
Teleiopsis have a Holarctic distribution, with one exception. The centre of evolution is found in the area surrounding the Mediterranean.

== Species ==
- Teleiopsis albifemorella (E. Hofmann, 1867)
- Teleiopsis bagriotella (Duponchel, 1840)
- Teleiopsis baldiana (Barnes & Busck, 1920)
- Teleiopsis brevivalva Pitkin, 1988
- Teleiopsis diffinis (Haworth, 1828)
- Teleiopsis insignita Pitkin, 1988
- Teleiopsis latisacculus Pitkin, 1988
- Teleiopsis lunariella (Walsingham, 1908)
- Teleiopsis motleella Ponomarenko & Park, 2007
- Teleiopsis paulheberti Huemer & Mutanen, 2012
- Teleiopsis rosalbella (Fologne, 1862)
- Teleiopsis sophistica (Meyrick, 1935)
- Teleiopsis terebinthinella (Herrich-Schäffer, 1856)
- Teleiopsis tchukotka Bidzilya, 2012
