= Teleiopsis paulheberti =

Scientific classification
- Kingdom: Animalia
- Phylum: Arthropoda
- Clade: Pancrustacea
- Class: Insecta
- Order: Lepidoptera
- Family: Gelechiidae
- Genus: Teleiopsis
- Species: T. paulheberti

Binomial name
- Teleiopsis paulheberti Huemer & Mutanen, 2012

Species of moth

Teleiopsis paulheberti is a moth of the family Gelechiidae. It is found in the south-western Alps, the Apennines and the Pyrenees.

The wingspan is 21–22 mm.
