= Teleiopsis sophistica =

Scientific classification
- Kingdom: Animalia
- Phylum: Arthropoda
- Class: Insecta
- Order: Lepidoptera
- Family: Gelechiidae
- Genus: Teleiopsis
- Species: T. sophistica

Binomial name
- Teleiopsis sophistica (Meyrick, 1935)

Synonyms
- Telphusa sophistica Meyrick, 1935

Species of moth

Teleiopsis sophistica is a moth of the family Gelechiidae. It is found in China (Shanghai).
