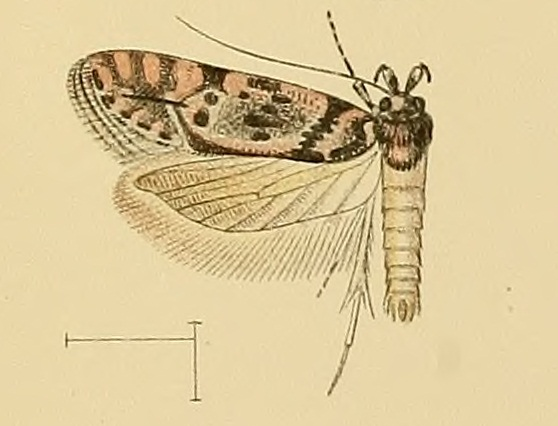

Scientific classification
- Domain: Eukaryota
- Kingdom: Animalia
- Phylum: Arthropoda
- Class: Insecta
- Order: Lepidoptera
- Family: Gelechiidae
- Genus: Teleiopsis
- Species: T. lunariella

Binomial name
- Teleiopsis lunariella (Walsingham, 1908)

Synonyms
- Gelechia lunariella Walsingham, 1908

= Teleiopsis lunariella =

Species of moth

Teleiopsis lunariella is a moth of the family Gelechiidae. It is found on the Canary Islands.

The wingspan is 15–17 mm. The forewings are cinereous (ash-grey) to rosy reddish, sprinkled and suffused with tawny grey and black scaling. The hindwings are tawny grey with a rosy tinge.

The larvae feed on Rumex lunaria. They mine the leaves of their host plant.
