= Jyles =

Jyles is a given name and surname. Notable people with the name include:

== Given name ==
- Jyles Coggins (1921–2011), American politician
- Jyles Tucker (born 1983), American football player

== Surname ==
- Steven Jyles (born 1982), American gridiron football player

== See also ==
- Giles (given name)
- Giles (surname)
- Jiles
