= Geil =

Geil or Geils may refer to:

- "Geil" (song), a 1986 disco song by Bruce and Bongo
- Geils, the name used by The J. Geils Band when recording their 1977 album Monkey Island

== People with the surname ==
- William Edgar Geil (1865–1925), American explorer, author, and photographer
- J. Geils (1946–2017), lead guitarist of the J. Geils Band
- Karlheinz Geils (born 1955), German football player
- Donna Orender (Donna Geils Orender, born 1957), sports executive and basketball player

== See also ==
- Giel (disambiguation)
