= Teleiopsis terebinthinella =

Scientific classification
- Kingdom: Animalia
- Phylum: Arthropoda
- Class: Insecta
- Order: Lepidoptera
- Family: Gelechiidae
- Genus: Teleiopsis
- Species: T. terebinthinella

Binomial name
- Teleiopsis terebinthinella (Herrich-Schäffer, 1856)

Synonyms
- Gelechia terebinthinella Herrich-Schäffer, 1856

Species of moth

Teleiopsis terebinthinella is a moth of the family Gelechiidae. It is found in southern and south-eastern Europe, except the Iberian Peninsula and France. It has also been recorded from Turkey and the Near East. It is found up to heights of 1,600 meters (5,200 ft).

The wingspan is 17–20 mm (0.67–0.79 in). Adults are on wing from June to July.

The larvae feed on Pistacia terebinthus and Rhus coriaria.
