= Teleiopsis motleella =

Scientific classification
- Kingdom: Animalia
- Phylum: Arthropoda
- Class: Insecta
- Order: Lepidoptera
- Family: Gelechiidae
- Genus: Teleiopsis
- Species: T. motleella

Binomial name
- Teleiopsis motleella Ponomarenko & Park, 2007

Species of moth

Teleiopsis motleella is a moth of the family Gelechiidae. It is found in Korea.
