= Teleiopsis latisacculus =

Scientific classification
- Kingdom: Animalia
- Phylum: Arthropoda
- Class: Insecta
- Order: Lepidoptera
- Family: Gelechiidae
- Genus: Teleiopsis
- Species: T. latisacculus

Binomial name
- Teleiopsis latisacculus Pitkin, 1988

Species of moth

Teleiopsis latisacculus is a moth of the family Gelechiidae. It is found in North Macedonia and from Turkey to Egypt.

The wingspan is 15–17 mm. Adults are on wing in May to June.

The larvae feed on Rhus coriaria. There are some records for Pistacia terebinthus
