= Egide François Leemans =

Belgian painter

- Born: Egide François Leemans; 28 April 1839; Antwerp, Belgium
- Died: 2 January 1883 (aged 43); Antwerp, Belgium
- Education: Academy of Fine Arts of Antwerp.
- Occupations: Painter, draughtsman and engraver

Egide François Leemans or Egide Leemans (28 April 1839 in Antwerp – 2 January 1883 in Antwerp) was a Belgian painter, draughtsman and engraver. He is best known for his paintings and prints of waterscapes, harbours and seascapes in the evening or at night. His work represents a break with the tradition of grand themes in Belgian marine art in favour of a realist representation of nature.

== Life and work ==
Leemans studied at the Academy of Fine Arts of Antwerp. The teachers and pupils of the Antwerp Academy with an interest in marine painting worked in the Romantic tradition: Jacob Jacobs depicted stormy scenes and Hendrik Frans Schaefels preferred scenes of historic naval engagements. Leemans broke with this Romantic and historical approach to marine art in favour of a more realistic rendering of nature even in its modest appearance.

Leemans painted his marine landscapes from nature although he may have finalised his works in the studio. His most frequent subjects are landscapes of rivers or canals with sailing boats in old cities in Flanders and The Netherlands. He had a preference for showing the reflection of the moonlight on river landscapes. Most of his works have a silvery gray undertone. As his style of marine art did not follow the contemporary Romantic, grandiose vision of Belgian marine art, his works did not sell well and he died in relative poverty.

A few still lifes by Leemans depicting flowers and fruit typically set in a landscape are also recorded.

== Gallery ==
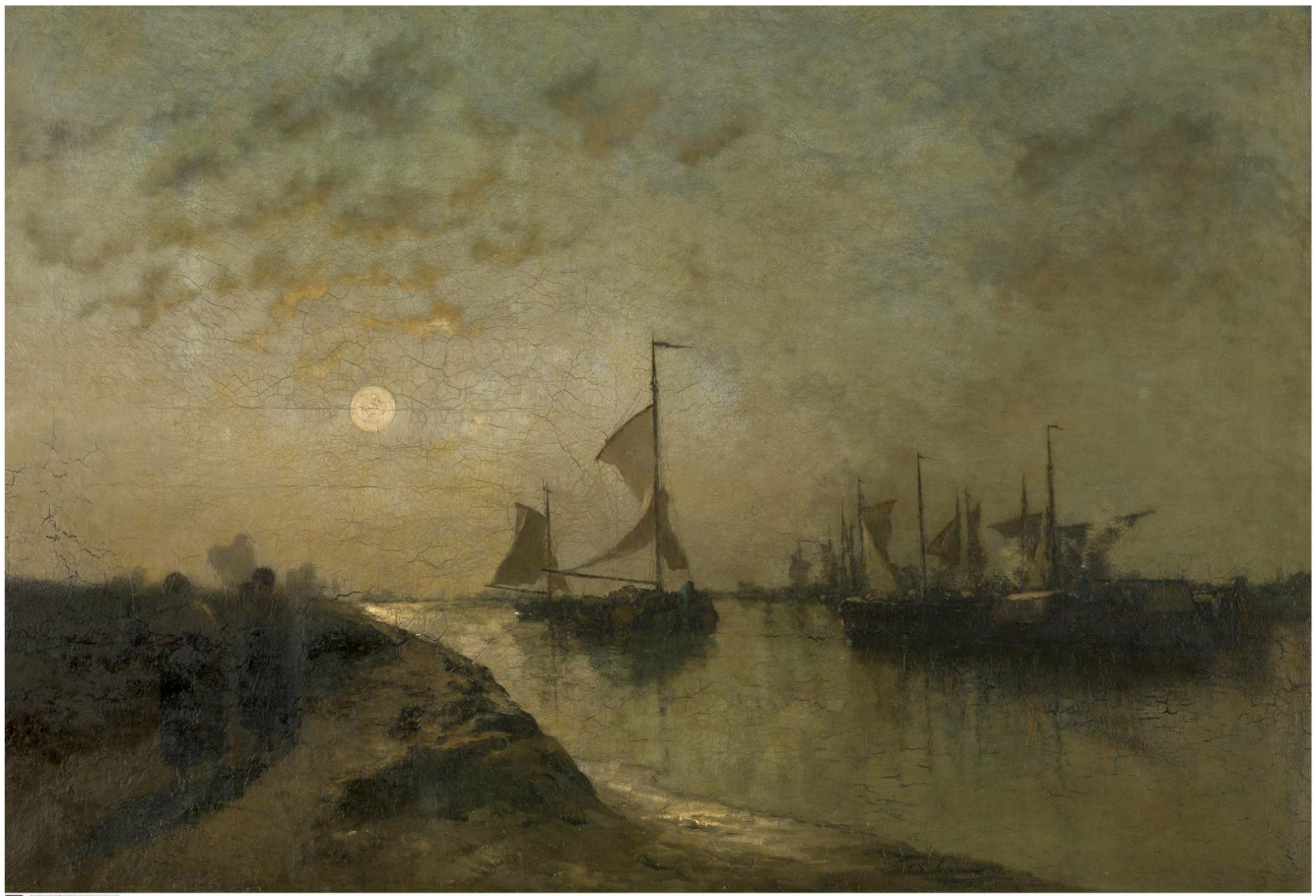
Summer evening

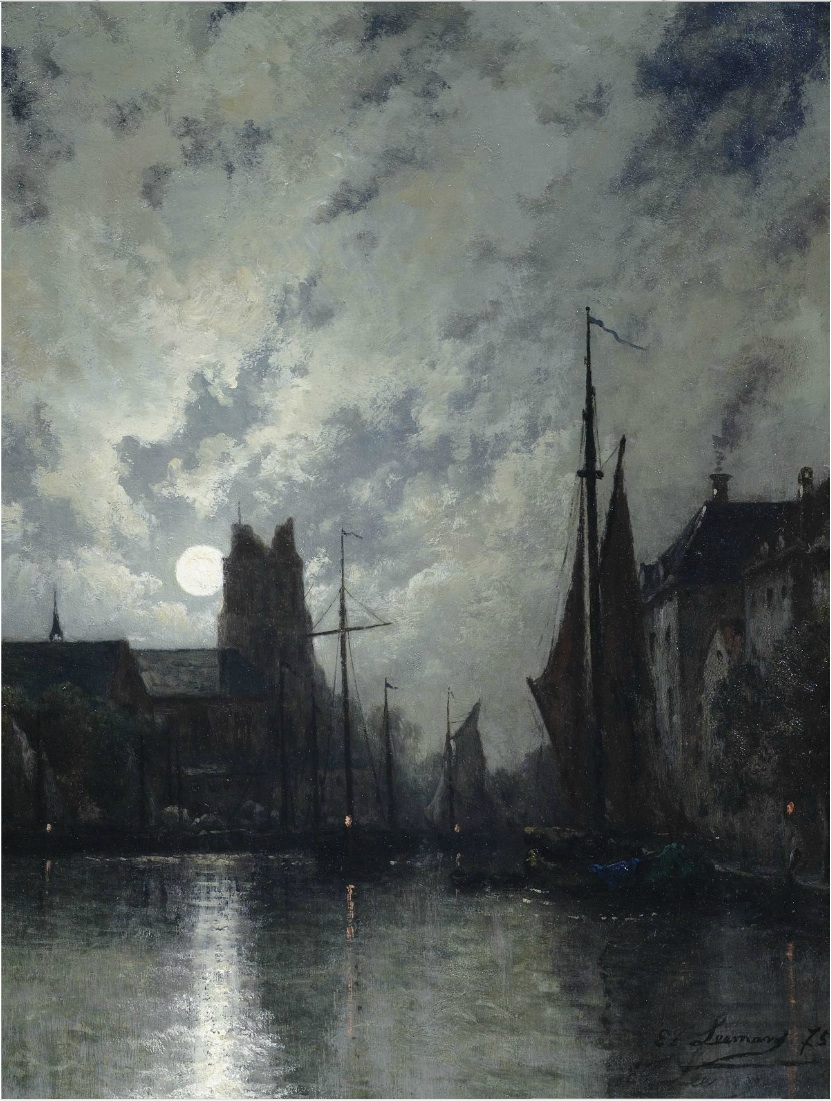
Canal in Dordrecht at moonlight

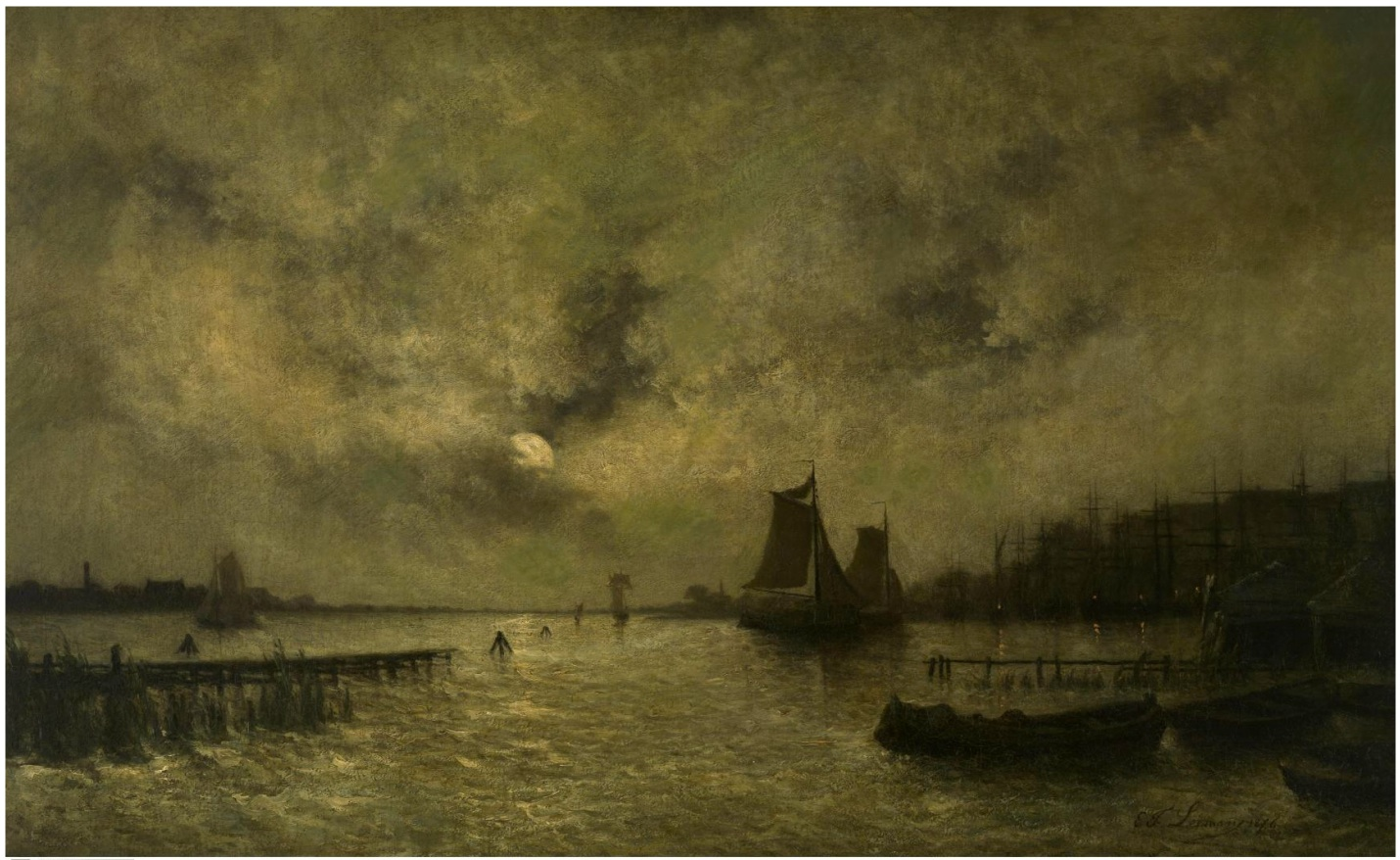
Seascape
