= Gilles Peycelon =

French footballer (born 1960)

Personal information
- Full name: Gilles Peycelon
- Date of birth: July 3, 1960 (age 66)
- Place of birth: Saint-Étienne, France
- Height: 1.77 m (5 ft 9 1/2 in)
- Position: Midfielder

Senior career*
Years	Team	Apps	(Gls)
1981–1988	Saint-Étienne	95	(2)
1988–1990	Chamois Niortais	35	(1)
1990–1992	Saint-Priest	53	(0)
- * Club domestic league appearances and goals

Gilles Peycelon (born July 3, 1960) is a former professional footballer who played as a midfielder. Peycelon is now a lawyer in Saint-Étienne with his own Law Office.
