= Giles Daubeney =

Giles Daubeney may refer to:

- Giles Daubeney, 3rd Baron Daubeney (died 1386), Baron Daubeney
- Giles Daubeney, 4th Baron Daubeney (1371?–1403), MP for Bedfordshire (UK Parliament constituency)
- Giles Daubeney, 6th Baron Daubeney (1393–1446)
- Giles Daubeney, 1st Baron Daubeney (1451–1508)
