= Giles Brydges =

Giles Brydges may refer to:

- Giles Brugge, 6th Baron Chandos (c. 1462–1511)
- Giles Brydges, 3rd Baron Chandos (c. 1548–1594), his great-grandson
- Sir Giles Brydges, 1st Baronet (1573–1637), English politician
- Giles Brydges (MP) for Herefordshire in 1455
