= Giles Cooper =

Giles Cooper may refer to:

- Giles Cooper (playwright) (1918–1966), Anglo-Irish playwright and radio dramatist
- Giles Cooper (producer), British entertainment producer, concert promoter and marketer
- Giles Cooper (actor) (born 1982), British actor
