= Giles Mackay =

British businessman (born 1962)

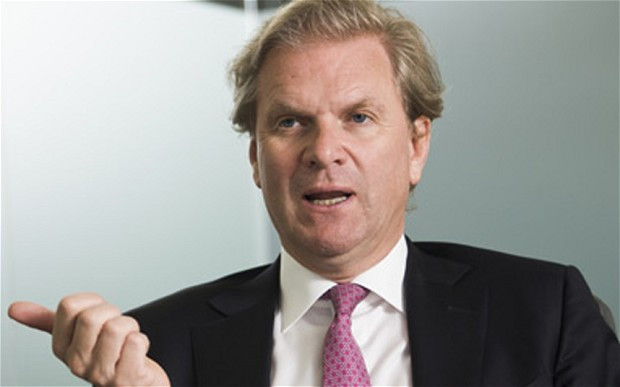
- Giles Mackay
- Born: Giles Cyril Patrick Mackay; March 1962 (age 63–64); Croydon, London
- Occupations: Businessman, Property investor
- Known for: Founding Hometrack; Founding Upstix
- Website: Official website www.upstix.com

Giles Cyril Patrick Mackay (born 1962) is a British businessman and property investor who founded Hometrack and, in 2022, the iBuying firm Upstix.

== Career ==
Mackay is a former barrister.

As a real-estate and property management entrepreneur, he started the first of the Assettrust companies in 1985 and grew through the corporate property sale and leaseback market. In 2003, he founded the Assettrust Companies, Assettrust Housing, a real-estate development company.

In 1999 he founded Hometrack, a property market analytics company in 1999, and served as its CEO until 2013. Hometrack initially focused on properties in central London. In 2017, the company was sold to Zoopla for £120 million.

In 2012, his estimated net worth was "over £100 million".
