= Gilles Motet =

French computer scientist and software engineer

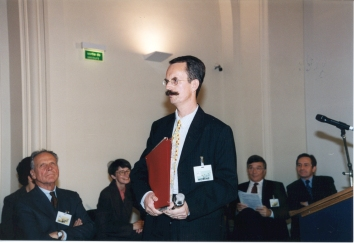
- Born: 22 June 1956 (age 70)
- Known for: Design of Dependable Computing Systems; Design of Dependable Ada software
- Scientific career
- Fields: Computer science Software engineering Risk management
- Workplaces: University of Toulouse

Gilles Motet (French: [mɔtɛ]; born 22 June 1956) is a French scientist in computer science, software engineering and risk management fields. He is now a professor at INSA Toulouse, University of Toulouse. He is the scientific director of La Fondation pour une Culture de Sécurité Industrielle.

== Works ==
A short list of his works:

- Gilles Motet (co-author), ISO 31000 "Risk Management. Principles and guidelines", International Organization for Standardization
- Gilles Motet (co-author), ISO Guide 73, Revision, "Risk management. Vocabulary", International Organization for Standardization
- Gilles Motet, J.-C. Geffroy, Special Issue on Dependable Computing, Theoretical Computer Sciences, vol. 290(2), Elsevier, 2003
- J.-C. Geffroy, Gilles Motet, Design of Dependable Computing Systems, Kluwer Academic Publishers, 2002
- Gilles Motet, A. Marpinard, J.-C. Geffroy, Design of Dependable Ada software, Prentice Hall, 1996
