= Gilles Gobeil =

Canadian electroacoustic music composer

Gilles Gobeil (born September 27, 1954) is an electroacoustic music composer from Sorel-Tracy, Quebec, Canada, and currently living in Montreal, Quebec, Canada. Gobeil received his musical education at the Université de Montréal (Mmus in Composition). Gobeil is professor for music theory at the Cégep de Drummondville and was guest professor for electro-acoustics at the Université de Montréal and at the Conservatoire de Montréal.

His works have been performed in concerts throughout Canada and abroad. Gobeil is a member of the Canadian Electroacoustic Community (CEC), Associate Composer of the Canadian Music Centre (CMC) and co-founder of the concert organization Réseaux des Arts Médiatiques, an organization for the production of media arts events.

His sound-world contains sounds that emulate crash of a door, machine rhythms, fire-alarm bells, machine-gun like sounds, smashing glass, even helicopter rotors, the march of troops, distant water gushing from a broken main. Often these appear in small snatches, in little rhythmic kernels. Gobeil is known for his industrial soundscapes and the incorporation of live instruments (in particular the ondes martenot) deep within the electroacoustic medium.

Gobeil has received numerous scholarships and commissions from institutes and festivals including ZKM Karlsruhe, GRM Paris, Ars Electronica Linz, ICMC Beijing, and the Banff Center, and his works have won many awards. His approach is similar to the “cinema pour l’oreille” (cinema for the ear), and in turn would like to “donner à voir” (lead to seeing) by means of sound.

== Awards and honors ==
=== Laureate on the international scene ===
- Métamorphoses Biennal Acousmatic Composition Competition (Belgium, 2002, 2000);
- CIMESP (International Electroacoustic Music Contest of São Paulo, Brazil, 2001, 1999, 97);
- Ciber@rt (Valencia, Spain, 1999);
- Bourges International Electroacoustic Music Competition (France, 1999, 89, 88);
- Stockholm Electronic Arts Award (Sweden, 1997, 94); Ars Electronica, Linz (Austria, 1995);
- Luigi Russolo International Competition, Varese (Italy, 1989, 88, 87);
- Newcomp Computer Music Competition (USA, 1987); and
- Brock University Tape Music Competition, St Catharines (Canada, 1985).

=== Other honors in national competitions ===
- Grand Prize from SOCAN (the Canadian performing rights society); (1993)
- Robert Fleming Prize from the Canadian Music Council; (1985)
- Composition Award from PROCAN (a former Canadian performing rights society), currently SDE Canada (1984).
- Premier Prix and Prix du public in the second international Electroacoustic Music Competition of São Paulo, for his work Nuit cendre.

== Recordings ==
- Les lointains (empreintes DIGITALes, IMED 15134, 2015)
- Trois songes (empreintes DIGITALes, IMED 0892, 2008)
- Trilogie d’ondes with [Suzanne Binet-Audet] (empreintes DIGITALes, IMED 0576, 2005)
- Le contrat with [René Lussier] (empreintes DIGITALes, IMED 0372, 2003)
- … dans le silence de la nuit… (empreintes DIGITALes, IMED 0155, 2001)
- La mécanique des ruptures (empreintes DIGITALes, IMED 9421, 1994)

== List of works ==
- Associations libres (1990), electric guitar, and tape
- Le contrat (1996–2003)
- Derrière la porte la plus éloignée (1998)
- Éclats de perle (2002)
- Entre les deux rives du printemps (2006)
- Là où vont les nuages (1990–91), ondes Martenot, interactive system, and tape
- Nous sommes heureux de (1992)
- Nuit cendre (1995)
- Ombres, espaces, silences (2005)
- La perle et l'oubli (1999–2002), ondes Martenot, and tape
- Point de passage (1997)
- Projet Proust (1995, 2001)
- Rivage (1986)
- Soledad (1998, 2000), guitar, and tape
- Traces (1985)
- Le vertige inconnu (1993–94)
- La ville machine (1992)
- Voix blanche (1988–89), ondes Martenot, and tape

== See also ==
- Music of Canada
- List of Canadian composers
