= Egide Nzojibwami =

- Citizenship: Burundi; Canada
- Occupations: Geologist; academic; environmental / groundwater consultant
- Employer(s): University of Burundi; Technosol Engineering Ltd.
- Known for: First Burundian to become a member of The Church of Jesus Christ of Latter-day Saints; Dean of the Faculty of Engineering, University of Burundi

Academic background
- Education: University of Calgary (MSc); University of Liège (PhD)
- Thesis: Study of chloride migration in Cold Lake, Alberta, Canada (1999)

Academic work
- Institutions: University of Burundi; Technosol Engineering Ltd.

Egide Nzojibwami was a geologist and civil engineer who was the first Burundian national to become a member of the Church of Jesus Christ of Latter-day Saints (LDS Church).

Nzojibwami was educated at the University of Liège in Liège, Belgium, and he and his wife were baptised into the LDS Church on 14 April 1985. He returned to Burundi and eventually became Dean of the Faculty of Engineering at the University of Burundi. Nzojibwami holds a PhD in Geology from the University of Liège, Belgium and a MSc in civil engineering from the University of Calgary, Canada.

On 27 November 1992, Nzojibwami was set apart as the first branch president of the LDS Church in Burundi. In November 1993, at the beginning of the Burundi Civil War, Nzojibwami left Burundi and emigrated to Canada.

Settling in Calgary, Alberta, Nzojibwami established Technosol Engineering Ltd., a consulting corporation in groundwater and environmental assessment that works in the oil and gas industry and for municipal developments.

Nzojibwami investigated chloride migration in the Cold Lake area of Alberta, Canada, as part of his thesis focusing on the effects of industrial activities on groundwater contamination.

== Bibliography ==
- "Branch flourishing in Burundi", Church News, 1993-08-21
- Donald Q. Cannon, Richard O. Cowan, Arnold K. Garr (eds.) (2000). Encyclopedia of Latter-day Saint History (Salt Lake City, Utah: Deseret Book) s.v. "Burundi"
- Deseret News 2001–2002 Church Almanac (Salt Lake City, Utah: Deseret News, 2000) pp. 291–292
- Nzojibwami, E. (1999). Study of chloride migration in Cold Lake, Alberta, Canada (Master's thesis, University of Calgary, Calgary, Canada).
- (2022). From Burundi to Canada. ChurchofJesusChrist.org.
