= Gilles De Oliveira =

French professional football player (born 1984)

Personal information
- Date of birth: October 30, 1984 (age 42)
- Place of birth: Brétigny-sur-Orge, France
- Height: 1.78 m (5 ft 10 in)
- Position: Defender

Team information
- Current team: AS Yzeure

Senior career*
Years	Team	Apps	(Gls)
2002–2004	Troyes AC (B team)		
2003–2004	Troyes AC	2	(0)
2004–2009	ÉDS Montluçon		
2009–	AS Yzeure		
- * Club domestic league appearances and goals as of 20:26, 26 November 2009 (UTC)

Gilles De Oliveira (born October 30, 1984) is a French professional football player. Currently, he plays in the Championnat de France amateur for AS Yzeure.

He played on the professional level in Ligue 2 for Troyes AC.
