= Gilles Hilary =

French academic

- Born: France
- Education: Cornell University (MBA); ESC Clermont (MA); University of Chicago (PhD)
- Scientific career
- Fields: Accounting
- Workplaces: Hong Kong University of Science and Technology; INSEAD; Georgetown University

Gilles Hilary is a French accountant and academic. He is the George R. Houston Endowed Professor of accounting and control at Georgetown University.

== Biography ==
Gilles Hilary is from France. He was educated in France and the United States. Hilary obtained an MBA degree from Cornell University, an MA degree from ESC Clermont, and a PhD degree from the University of Chicago. He currently is an accountant and professor at Georgetown University. He is also a professional French accountant, and earned a DESCF qualification. He previously was a professor at INSEAD for six years and was at the Hong Kong University of Science and Technology (HKUST) for seven years. He was previously an auditor for KPMG and Ernst & Young.

== Research ==
Hilary's research focuses on the use of accounting information to make investing and financing decisions. His work has been published in journals such as The Accounting Review, the Journal of Accounting and Economics, the Journal of Accounting Research, the Journal of Finance, the Journal of Financial Economic, Management Science or the Review of Accounting Studies.

== Awards ==
- Franklin Prize for Teaching Excellence, (MBA Teaching), 2007
- Elected "Best Professor for Required Courses" by MBA students, 2007
- Franklin Prize for Teaching Excellence (Undergraduate Teaching), 2005
- Wei Lun Fellowship, HKUST, 2002–2004
- Oscar G. Mayer Foundation Fellowship, 2001–2002
- University of Chicago Fellowship, 1997–2001
- SSRN Top Ten download lists, 2001–2008
- Aoki Outstanding Paper Award, 2000

== Publications ==
- Volodymyr Babich and Gilles Hilary. "Distributed Ledgers and Operations." Manufacturing & Service Operations Management (M&SOM), Forthcoming (2018)
- Sterling Huang and Gilles Hilary. "Zombie Board: Board Tenure and Firm Performance." Journal of Accounting Research, 56, 4 (September 2018): 1285–1329.
- The Bright Side of Managerial Over-optimism. Journal of Accounting and Economics 62.1 (2016): 46-64 (with Charles Hsu, Benjamin Segal and Rencheng Wang).
- Management Forecast Consistency, The Journal of Accounting Research, Vol. 52, Iss. 1, 2014, 163–191 (with Charles Hsu and Rencheng Wang).
- The Role of Analysts in Intra-Industry Information Transfer, The Accounting Review, July 2013, Vol. 88, No. 4, pp. 1265–1287. (with Rui Shen).
- Analyst Forecasts Consistency, The Journal of Finance, Vol. 68, Iss. 1, pp. 271–297, February 2013 (with Charles Hsu).
- The Role of Anchoring Bias in the Equity Market: Evidence from Analysts' Earnings Forecasts and Stock Returns. Journal of Financial and Quantitative Analysis, volume 48, issue 01, 2013, pp. 47–76 (with Ling Cen and KC John Wei).
- Endogenous Overconfidence in Managerial Forecasts. Journal of Accounting and Economics, Vol. 51, 2011, pp. 300–313 (with Charles Hsu).
- CEO Ability, Pay, and Firm Performance." Management Science, Vol. 56, Iss. 10, 2010, pp. 1633–1652 (with Yuk Ying Chang and Sudipto Dasgupta).
- How Does Financial Reporting Quality Relate to Investments Efficiency? - Journal of Accounting and Economics, Vol. 48, 2009, pp. 112–131 (with Gary Biddle and Rodrigo Verdi).
- The Effect of Auditor Quality on Financing Decisions. - The Accounting Review, Vol. 84, No. 4, 2009, pp. 1085–1117 (with Xin Chang and Sudipto Dasgupta).
- Does Religion Matter in Corporate Decision Making in America? - Journal of Financial Economics 93, 2009, 455-473 (with Kai Wai Hui).
- Accounting Quality and Firm-level Capital Investment. - The Accounting Review, Vol. 81, No. 5, 2006, 963-982 (with Gary Biddle)
- Organized Labor and Information Asymmetry in Financial Markets. - The Review of Accounting Studies, Vol. 11, Iss. 4.
- Does Past Success Lead Analysts to Become Overconfident? - Management Science, Vol. 52, No. 4, 489-500 (with Lior Menzly).
- Analyst Coverage and Financing Decisions. - Journal of Finance, Vol. 61, Iss 6, 3009-3048 (with Xin Chang and Sudipto Dasgupta).
- The Credibility of Self-Regulation: Evidence from the Accounting Profession's Peer Review Program. - Journal of Accounting and Economics 40, 211-229 (with Clive Lennox).
