= Gilles Engeldinger =

Luxembourgish footballer

Personal information
- Date of birth: 4 May 1984 (age 42)
- Place of birth: Luxembourg
- Position: Defender

Senior career*
Years	Team	Apps	(Gls)
2002–2003	FC 72 Erpeldange		
2003–2014	FC Etzella Ettelbruck	165	(2)
2014–2015	FC 72 Erpeldange	13	(0)

International career^{‡}
2003	Luxembourg	1	(0)
- * Club domestic league appearances and goals as of 27 June 2023 ‡ National team caps and goals as of 23 January 2010

Gilles Engeldinger (born 4 May 1984) is a former Luxembourgish footballer, who played for FC Etzella Ettelbruck in Luxembourg's domestic National Division.

== Club career ==
A defender, he played for Etzella from 2003 through 2014, after joining them from FC 72 Erpeldange.
