= Gilles Dambrine =

French engineer

Gilles Dambrine is a French engineer affiliated with the Institute of Electronic, Microelectronic and Nanotechnology (IEMN) in Lille, France. He was named a Fellow of the Institute of Electrical and Electronics Engineers (IEEE) in 2016 for contributions to the modeling of small signal and noise characteristics in nanoscale high-frequency devices.
