= Gilles Roussi =

French sculptor (born 1947)

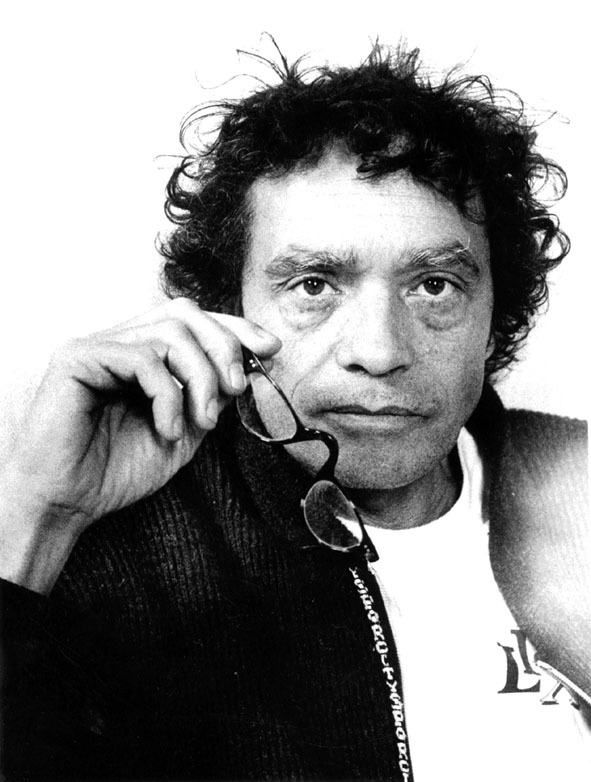
Roussi in 2003

Gilles Roussi (born 7 January 1947 in Konstanz, West Germany) is a French sculptor.
