= Paweł Giel =

Polish footballer (born 1989)

Personal information
- Full name: Paweł Giel
- Date of birth: 8 December 1989 (age 36)
- Place of birth: Tarnowskie Góry, Poland
- Height: 1.88 m (6 ft 2 in)
- Positions: Midfielder; forward

Team information
- Current team: Ożarowianka Ożarów Mazowiecki
- Number: 8

Youth career
- 2004–2005: Ruch Radzionków
- 2005–2007: Zantka Chorzów

Senior career*
Years	Team	Apps	(Gls)
2008–2011	Ruch Radzionków	84	(4)
2012	GKS Bełchatów	13	(0)
2013	Warta Poznań	15	(1)
2013–2014	Odra Opole	19	(2)
2014–2016	Stal Stalowa Wola	52	(0)
2016–2017	Stal Rzeszów	29	(8)
2018–2024	Hutnik Warsaw	125	(77)
2024–	Ożarowianka Ożarów Mazowiecki	11	(1)
- * Club domestic league appearances and goals as of 6 November 2024

Paweł Giel (born 8 December 1989) is a Polish professional footballer who plays as a midfielder or forward for V liga Masovia club Ożarowianka Ożarów Mazowiecki.

== Career ==
He used to play in the Ekstraklasa with GKS Bełchatów.

In the summer of 2020, Giel found employment as a paramedic, and was a front-line worker during the COVID-19 pandemic.

== Honours ==
Ruch Radzionków

- II liga West: 2009–10
- III liga Opole-Silesia: 2008–09

Stal Rzeszów

- Polish Cup (Subcarpathia regionals): 2016–17
- Polish Cup (Rzeszów-Dębica regionals): 2016–17

Hutnik Warsaw

- Regional league Warsaw I: 2017–18
