= Gilles de Gourmont =

Parisian bookseller and printer active

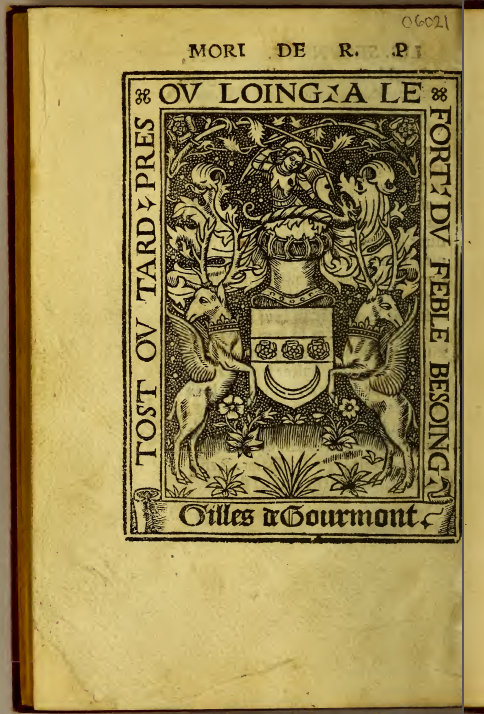
Printer's mark of Gilles de Gourmont.

Gilles de Gourmont (fl. 1499–1533), Egidius Gormontius in Latin, was a Parisian bookseller and printer active in Paris between 1499 and 1533.

He was one of three brothers engaged in the book trade in Paris. He, Robert de Gourmont and Jean de Gourmont traded separately but sometimes in collaboration (under the imprint apud Gormontios).

Gilles de Gourmont was the first Parisian printer to print books entirely in Greek, in 1507 and 1508. He also published the first Hebrew grammar in Paris (1508).
