= Gilles Cormery =

French poet and painter

Gilles Cormery (1950 in Tours – 1999 in Tours) was a French poet and painter.

Cormery painted circa 4000 oil paintings and watercolors as well as thousand drawings. Le Château de Tours, Tours Castle and Exhibition Museum in Tours, France, organized a tribute September - November 2012. Catalogues of his paintings and drawings are planned for publication in 2014.
