= Alfred Giles =

Alfred Giles may refer to:

- Alfred Giles (architect) (1853–1920), Texas architect
- Alfred Giles (civil engineer) (1816–1895), British civil engineer and politician
- Alfred Giles (explorer) (1846–1931), South Australian bushman, drover and explorer

== See also ==
- Alfred William Gyles (1888–1967), New Zealand chess champion (1931, 1936)
