= Gilles Constantinian =

French footballer (born 1964)

Personal information
- Full name: Gilles Constantinian
- Date of birth: October 27, 1964 (age 62)
- Place of birth: Lyon, France
- Height: 1.84 m (6 ft 1/2 in)
- Position: Striker

Senior career*
Years	Team	Apps	(Gls)
1982–1987	Lyon	4	(0)
1987–1990	Gueugnon	88	(17)
1990–1991	Chamois Niortais	33	(9)
1991–1993	Créteil	44	(13)
1993–1996	Grenoble	77	(30)
1996–1997	Nîmes	9	(2)
1997–1998	Besançon	13	(5)
1998–1999	FC Vaulx-en-Velin	25	(5)
- * Club domestic league appearances and goals

Gilles Constantinian (born October 27, 1964) is a former professional footballer. He played as a centre forward.
