= Gilles Dowek =

French computer scientist (1966–2025)

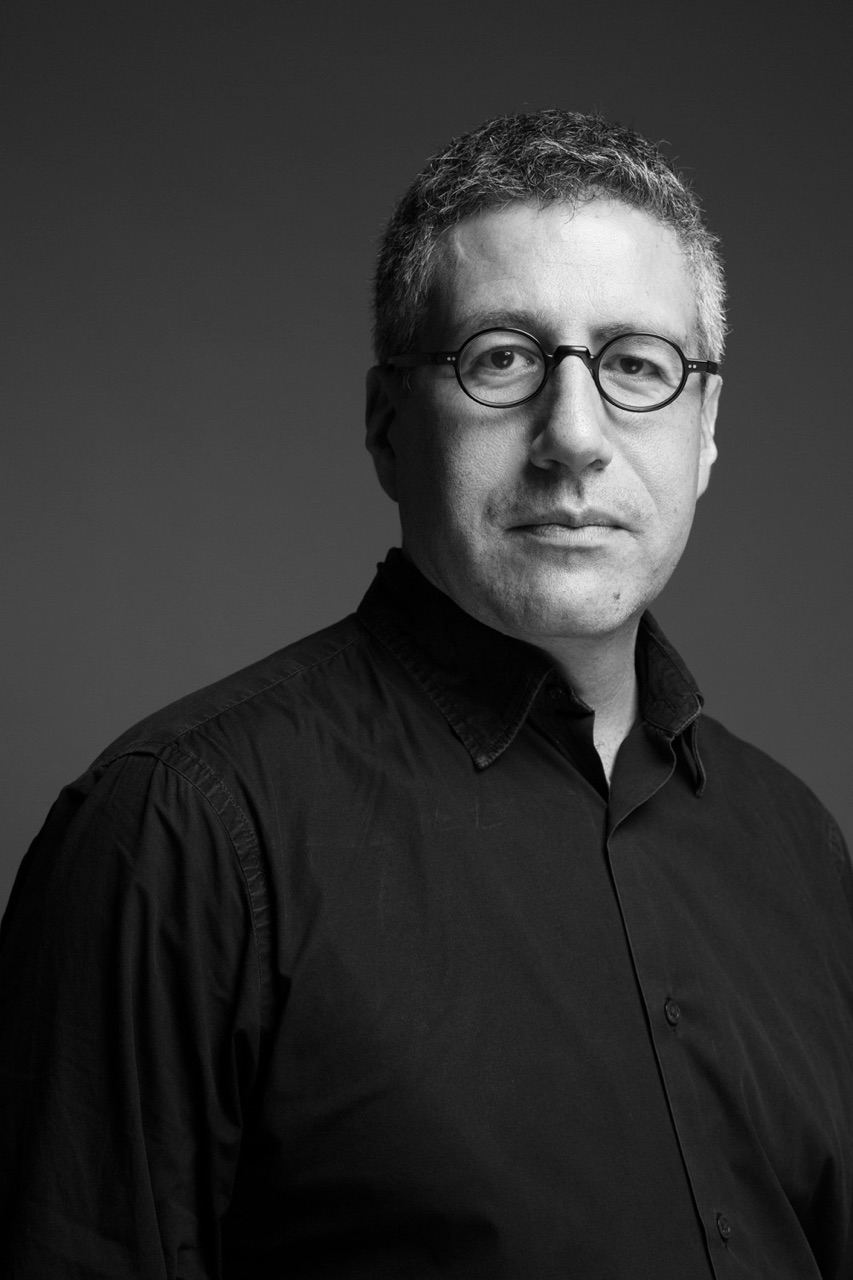
Gilles Dowek

Gilles Dowek (20 December 1966 – 21 July 2025) was a French computer scientist and logician.

== Biography ==
Dowek was born on 20 December 1966 in Paris. In 1991, Gilles Dowek defended a doctoral thesis at the University of Paris 7 entitled Automatic Proving in the Calculus of Constructions.

He taught at the École polytechnique from 2002 to 2010 and then was a researcher at INRIA, attached to the Formal Methods laboratory of the École normale supérieure Paris-Saclay where he was also an attached professor until his death.

In 2007, he received the Grand Prix de philosophie de l'Académie française for his book The Metamorphoses of Calculus. An astonishing history of mathematics.

He was one of the initiators of Logipedia, an encyclopaedia of mathematical proofs launched in 2019. One of the aims was to enable different proof assistants to interoperate.

He died in Paris on 21 July 2025 from cancer, aged 58.

== Personal life ==
Dowek was a homosexual, and chaired the Association for the Recognition of the Rights of Homosexual and Trans People to Immigration and Residence.
