= Antonio Giel =

Aruban footballer

Personal information
- Full name: Antonio Giel
- Date of birth: November 20, 1981 (age 44)
- Height: 1.80 m (5 ft 11 in)
- Positions: Goalkeeper; midfielder

Team information
- Current team: Nacional
- Number: 1

Youth career
- Nacional

Senior career*
Years	Team	Apps	(Gls)
2002–2018	Nacional	230	(0)
2018–2022	Juventud TL	20	(0)
2022–	Nacional	0	(0)
Total		0	(0)

International career
2006–2010	Aruba	1	(0)

Managerial career
- 2022–: Juventud TL (assistant)
- * Club domestic league appearances and goals

Antonio Giel (born November 20, 1981), known as Antonio, is an Aruban footballer who plays as a goalkeeper or midfielder for Aruban Division di Honor club Nacional and a former member of the Aruba national team. He made a single appearance for his country in 2008.

== Honours ==
Nacional

- Aruban Division di Honor: 2003–04, 2006–07, 2016–17

== National team statistics ==
Aruba national team
Year	Apps	Goals
2008	1	0
Total	1	0
