= Giles Smith (disambiguation) =

Giles Smith (born 1962) is a British writer and musician

Giles Smith may also refer to:

- Giles Smith (swimmer) (born 1991), American swimmer
- Giles Alexander Smith (1829–1876), general in the Union Army during the American Civil War
- Giles Smith, co-founder of Gilbern Sports Cars

== See also ==
- Giles Scott-Smith (born 1968), British–Dutch academic
