= Giles (bacteriophage) =

Mycobacterium phage Giles

Virus classification
- (unranked): Virus
- Realm: Duplodnaviria
- Kingdom: Heunggongvirae
- Phylum: Uroviricota
- Class: Caudoviricetes
- Order: Caudovirales
- Family: Siphoviridae
- Genus: Gilesvirus
- Species: Mycobacterium phage Giles

Genus of viruses

Giles is a bacteriophage that infects Mycobacterium smegmatis bacteria. The genome of this phage is very different from that of other mycobacteriophages and is highly mosaic. More than half of its predicted genes are novel and are not seen in other species.
