= Tilen =

Tilen is a name given to a legend Slovenian masculine name, which is a variant of the name Giles.

== Notable people with this name ==
- Tilen Bartol (born 1997), Slovenian ski jumper
- Tilen Debelak (born 1991), Slovenian alpine skier
- Tilen Klemenčič (born 1995), Slovenian footballer
- Tilen Kodrin (born 1994), Slovenian handball player
- Tilen Nagode (born 1996), Slovenian footballer
- Tilen Sirše (born 1990), Slovenian luger
- Tilen Žitnik (born 1991), Slovenian tennis player

== See also ==
- Giles (given name)
