= Egidijus Juška =

Lithuanian footballer

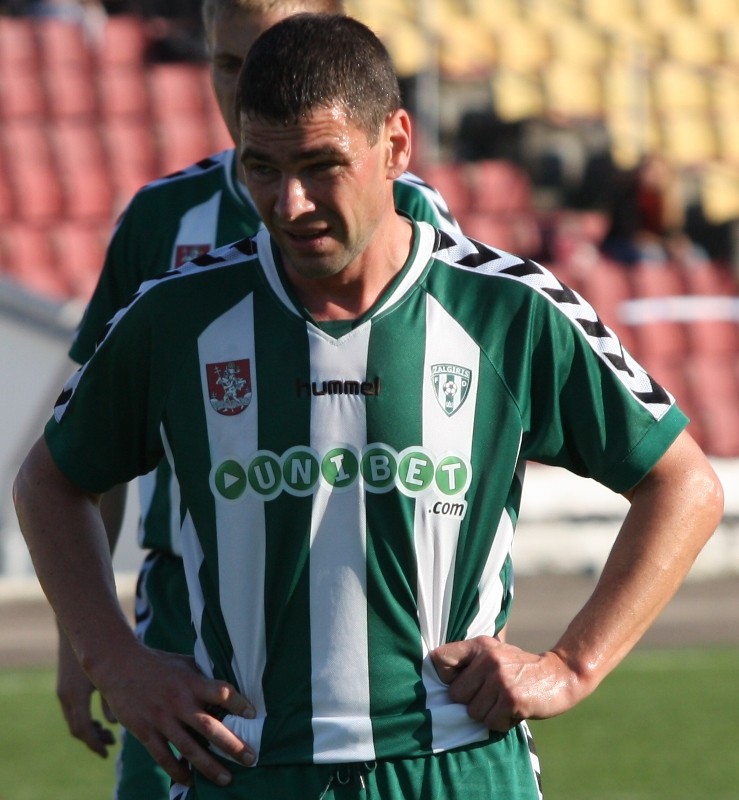

Personal information
- Full name: Egidijus Juška
- Date of birth: 12 March 1975 (age 51)
- Place of birth: Vilnius, Lithuanian SSR, Soviet Union
- Height: 1.81 m (5 ft 11 in)
- Positions: Attacking midfielder; forward

Senior career*
Years	Team	Apps	(Gls)
1992–1994	Geležinis Vilkas Vilnius	47	(2)
1994–1996	Kareda-Sakalas Šiauliai	31	(4)
1996–1997	Panerys Vilnius	38	(6)
1998	Kareda Šiauliai	17	(2)
1998	Atlantas Klaipėda	5	(0)
1999	Žalgiris Vilnius	10	(4)
1999	Ardena Vilnius	6	(1)
2000	TVMK Tallinn	22	(24)
2001	Torpedo-MAZ Minsk	20	(5)
2002–2003	Irtysh Pavlodar	33	(4)
2004–2005	TVMK Tallinn	50	(33)
2006	Qarabağ Ardam	4	(0)
2006–2008	Vėtra Vilnius	53	(7)
2009–2013	Žalgiris Vilnius	34	(2)
Total		370	(96)

International career
1999	Lithuania	1	(0)
- * Club domestic league appearances and goals

Egidius Juška (born 12 March 1975) is a Lithuanian former professional footballer, who last played in the A Lyga the highest level of Lithuanian for Žalgiris Vilnius.

== Career ==
Juška won two Kazakhstan Super League titles while playing for Irtysh Pavlodar and one Estonian Mesitriliiga title during his second spell at TVMK Tallinn. He plays the position of midfielder and is 1.81 m tall and weighs 78 kg.

== International career ==
Juška is the former member of the Lithuania national football team.
