= Gilles Le Guen =

Gilles Le Guen, alias Abdel Jelil (Nantes, 21 February 1955) is a French self-styled jihadist.

== Career ==
Gilles Le Guen was born in the Loire-Atlantique and started his career in the merchant navy, where he served for fifteen years. (Note: Some sources, such as Le Figaro, state that he served for thirty years and was an officer.)

According to himself, Le Guen converted to Islam in 1985, while living in France. In the following years, he travelled extensively in the Middle east and Africa; he stated that he had settled in Mali in 2011. He worked as a shepherd 30 kilometres off Timbuktu. (Note: According to Serge Daniel, correspondent of France 24 to Bamako who met with Le Guen. Quoted in Gilles Le Guen..., France24)

Le Guen appears to have taken a softer line on the Islamist agenda: according to Daniel, he personally intervening to prevent jihadists from harming local citizens; He was also reported to have fallen out with Mohamed Mossa, head of the jihadist police, over the treatment of women; he openly criticised him and went as far as personally freeing women imprisoned by Mossa.

In September 2012, Le Guen was brought to the attention of the French secret services when he was identified on a photograph of Al-Qaeda in the Islamic Maghreb (AQIM) members.

After the jihadist takeover of Timbuktu, Le Guen moved into the city, where he was appointed to organise electricity distribution. In October 2012, Le Guen appeared on a YouTube video, in which he made threats against France, the US and the United Nations in the event of a Western intervention in Mali during the 2012 Northern Mali conflict. He notably stated that a Western intervention would "make our struggle legitimate like those of our brothers of Afghanistan and Palestine. We will fight to the end." (Note: "rendra notre lutte légitime comme celle de nos frères d'Afghanistan et de Palestine. Nous nous battrons jusqu'au bout". Quoted in Le djihadiste français Gilles Le Guen arrêté au Mali, Le Figaro)

On 11 November 2012, he was arrested by AQIM on suspicions of espionnage and political unorthodoxy, but was released in December.

In January 2013, Le Guen was an interview to L'Express, where he detailed his experience.

He was captured in the night of 27 to 28 April 2013 by French commandos of the COS, in the context of Operation Serval. The commandos also captured his wife and five children, who were exfiltrated and repatriated to France.

French Minister of Defence Jean-Yves Le Drian stated that Le Guen had "manifestly fought amongst jihadist groups"; he further declared that Le Guen was a "lost soul who bec[a]me terrorist" (Note: "C'est un paumé qui devient terroriste". Quoted in Le Figaro)

He was then handed over to Malian authorities.

== Notes and references ==
=== External links ===
- (in French) Comment Gilles Le Guen a été capturé au Mali, Dominique Merchet, Secret Défense
- (in English) Gilles Le Guen, Breton sailor who 'followed bin Laden', France24
- (in French) Le djihadiste français au Mali : "une dérive individuelle de fanatisme", lemonde.fr
- (in French) Qui est Gilles Le Guen, le djihadiste français arrêté au Mali?, L'Express
- (in French) Le djihadiste français Gilles Le Guen arrêté au Mali, lemonde.fr
- (in French) Mali. Un djihadiste appelé Gilles Le Guen arrêté par les islamistes, Le Télégramme
- (in French) Le djihadiste français Gilles Le Guen arrêté au Mali, Le Figaro
- (in English) French Islamist captured ‘after fighting’ in Mali, BBC
