= Gilles Lauzon =

French coppersmith

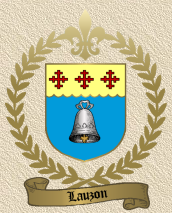

Gilles Lauzon (Lauson) (born Saint-Julien parish, Caen, Province of Normandy, France; 1631–1687) was a talented French coppersmith and a member of "Le Grande Recrue", a group of roughly 100 Frenchman recruited to populate the colony of New France. Today, nearly 20,000 people (predominantly in Canada and the United States) can trace their ancestry to his lineage. The spelling of the surname has been modified by several branches of the family, and currently includes Lozen, Lozon, Louzon, Lozo, Loso, Lauzau, Lewson, Lewsaw, LaSaw, and Lauson.

Le Grande Recrue originally left on the ship Saint-Nicolas de Nantes, under the command of Captain Pierre Lebesson. After 350 leagues at sea, it was necessary to turn back. Water seeped into the hold and threatened to spoil all the provisions. Paul de Chomedey (Maisonneuve) placed the passengers on an island before docking at Saint Nazaire. They then had to find another ship, transport the baggage and replacement supplies, and feed all the passengers while waiting. This was at the expense of the Compagnie de Montreal. The replacement ship Sainte-Marguerite set sail on 20 July 1653, and arrived in Quebec on 22 September 1653. There was much illness aboard the ship, claiming the lives of eight passengers at sea.

Lauzon was the son of Pierre-Paul Lauzon and Anne Boivin. He married Marie Jacquette Archambault, daughter of Jacques Archambault and Françoise Toureau, on November 27, 1656, in Montréal. They had 13 children, 4 sons and 9 daughters, named Michelle-Anne Lauzon, Marguerite Lauzon, Françoise Lauzon, Marie Lauzon, Catherine Sicard, Séraphin Lauzon, Louise Lauzon, Michel Lauzon, Paul Lauzon, Marie-Madeleine Lauzon, Anne Lauzon, Jeanne Lauzon and Gilles Lauzon.
