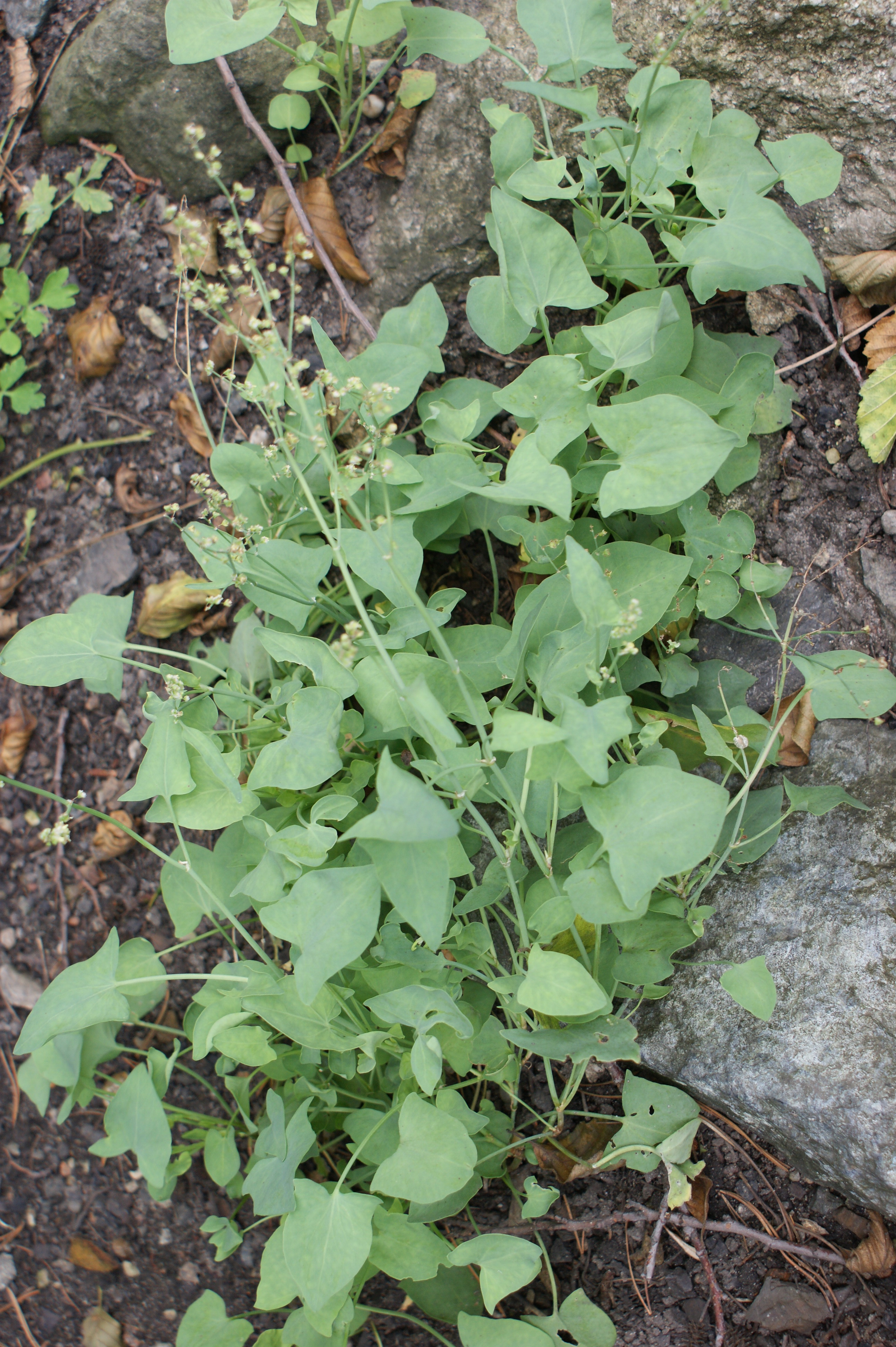

Scientific classification
- Kingdom: Plantae
- Clade: Embryophytes
- Clade: Tracheophytes
- Clade: Spermatophytes
- Clade: Angiosperms
- Clade: Eudicots
- Order: Caryophyllales
- Family: Polygonaceae
- Genus: Rumex
- Species: R. scutatus

Binomial name
- Rumex scutatus L.

Synonyms
- List: Acetosa alpestris (Jacq.) Á.Löve; Acetosa hortensis Garsault; Acetosa pratensis subsp. alpestris (Jacq.) Á.Löve; Acetosa scutata (L.) Mill.; Acetosa scutata subsp. hastifolius (M.Bieb.) Á.Löve & B.M.Kapoor; Lapathum alpestre (Jacq.) Scop.; Lapathum scutatum (L.) Lam.; Rumex acetosa subsp. alpestris (Jacq.) Á.Löve; Rumex acmophorus Gand.; Rumex aetnensis C.Presl; Rumex alpestris Jacq.; Rumex bellojocensis Gand.; Rumex glaucus Jacq.; Rumex hastatus Link ex Meisn.; Rumex hastifolius Campd.; Rumex hastifolius M.Bieb.; Rumex pubescens K.Koch; Rumex scutatus f. glaucus (Jacq.) Bolzon; Rumex scutatus f. monstrosus Meisn.; Rumex scutatus subsp. gallaecicus Lago; Rumex scutatus subsp. glaucus (Jacq.) E.V.Vulf; Rumex scutatus subsp. pyrenaeus Bonnier & Layens; Rumex scutatus subsp. pyrenaicus Bonnier & Layens; Rumex scutatus var. aetnensis (C.Presl) Meisn.; Rumex scutatus var. glaucus (Jacq.) Poir.; Rumex scutatus var. hastifolius (M.Bieb.) W.D.J.Koch; Rumex scutatus var. hastilis W.D.J.Koch; Rumex scutatus var. hortensis Gaudin; Rumex scutatus var. insularis Briq.; Rumex scutatus var. maculatus Gaudin; Rumex scutatus var. subcordatus Döll; Rumex scutatus var. triangularis W.D.J.Koch; Rumex scutatus var. virescens St.-Lag.; Rumex scutatus var. vulgaris Meisn.; Rumex subvirescens Gand.

= Rumex scutatus =

Species of herb

Rumex scutatus (syn. Rumex alpestris) is a plant in the buckwheat family, used as a culinary herb. Its common names include French sorrel, buckler sorrel, shield-leaf sorrel, and sometimes the culinary name "green-sauce".

As a culinary herb, it is used in salads, soups, and sauces (especially for fish). French sorrel tastes tart from its oxalic acid content, with a hint of lemon. Later in the season, it can be bitter.

French sorrel is hardy in most regions, tolerating frost, full sun and short dry spells. It grows quickly to a clump up to 1 m (3.3 ft) in diameter, with long leaves up to 10 cm (4 in) wide. It is sometimes preferred for culinary uses to Rumex acetosa, common sorrel.
