= Egidio =

Egidio is an Italian masculine given name. People with the name include:

== Given name ==
- Egidio (saint) (circa 650–710), Christian hermit saint
- Egidio Colonna, Giles of Rome (circa 1243–1316), European intellectual, archbishop
- Egidio da Viterbo, Giles of Viterbo (1469?–1532), Italian theologian and humanist
- Egidio Ariosto (1911–1998), Italian politician
- Egidio Calloni (born 1952), Italian former football striker
- Egidio Casagrande, Italian sculptor and metalworker
- Egidio Forcellini (1688–1768), Italian philologist
- Egidio Gennari (1876–1942), Italian politician
- Egidio Notaristefano (born 1966), Italian football player and manager
- Egídio Pereira Júnior (born 1986), Brazilian footballer
- Egidio Arévalo Rios (born 1982), Uruguayan football player
- Egidio Romualdo Duni (1708–1775), Italian composer
- Egidio Vagnozzi (1906–1980), Italian prelate of the Roman Catholic Church

== Middle name ==
- Luis Egidio Meléndez (1716–1780), Spanish painter

== See also ==
- Giles (given name)
