= Giles of Assisi =

Franciscan mystic

Blessed Giles of Assisi OFM
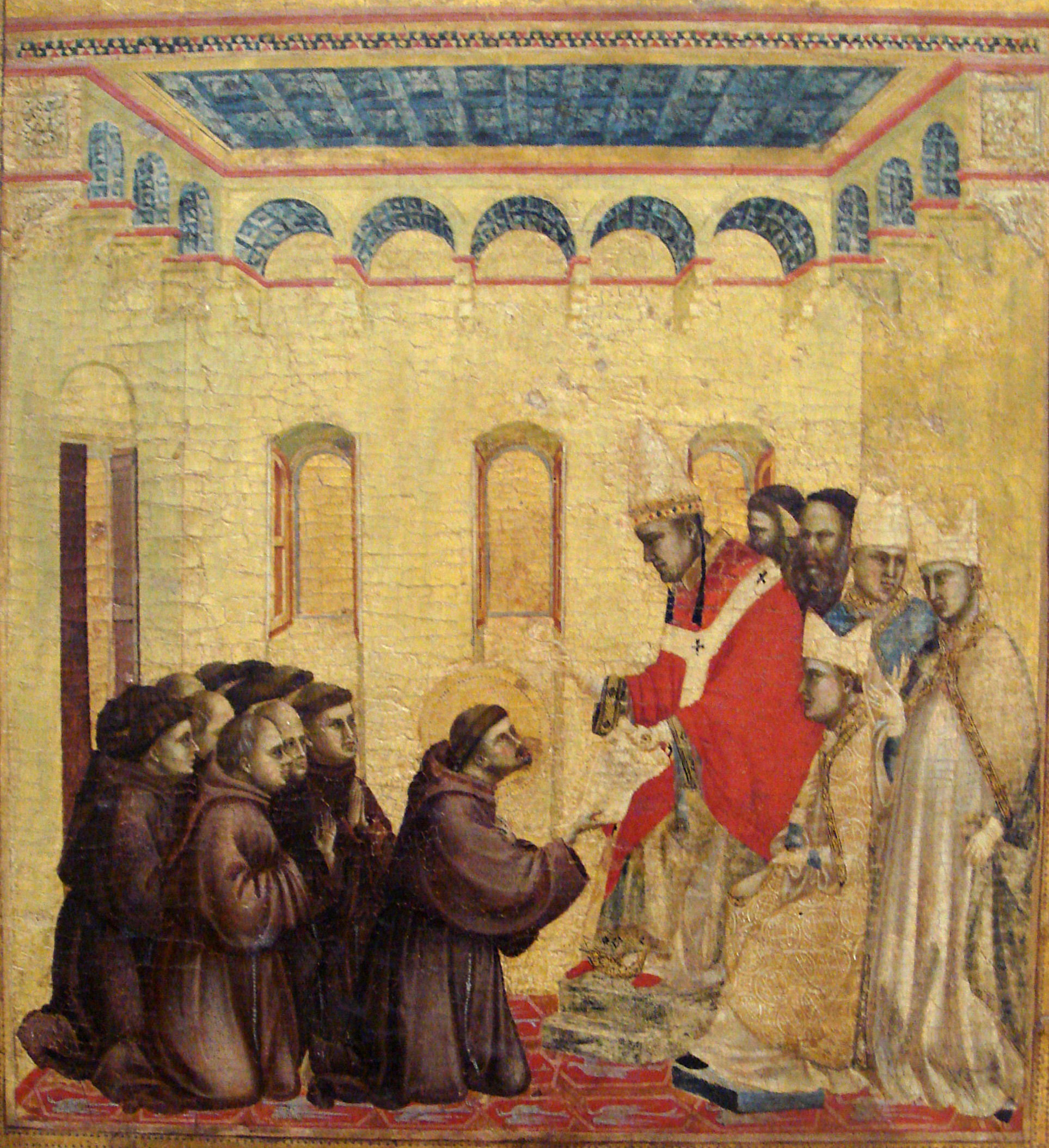

Religious
- Born: c. 1190; Assisi, Umbria, Papal States
- Died: 23 April 1262; Monteripido, Umbria, Papal States
- Venerated in: Roman Catholicism
- Beatified: 1777 by Pope Pius VI
- Feast: 23 April

Giles of Assisi (Latin: Aegidius; c. 1190 – 1262), was one of the original companions of Francis of Assisi and holds a leading place among them. St. Francis called him "The Knight of our Round Table".

== Life ==
Of Giles' origins and early life nothing certain is known, other than that he was a simple farmer. In April, 1209, moved by the example of two leading fellow-Assisians, who had already become the first followers of Francis, he begged permission to join the little band, and on the feast of St. George (23 April) was invested in a poor religious habit which Francis had begged for him. Almost immediately afterwards he set out with Francis to preach in the Marche. He accompanied Francis to Rome when the first Rule was approved orally by Pope Innocent III, and appears to have then received the monastic tonsure.

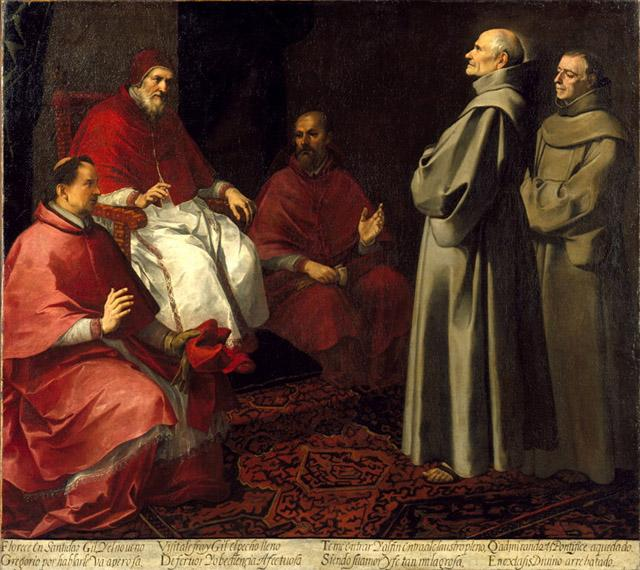
Blessed Egidius of Assisi, in levitation before Pope Gregory IX, 1645-46 by Bartolomé Esteban Murillo

About 1212 Giles made a pilgrimage to the tomb of St. James at Compostella, in Spain. Shortly after his return to Assisi he started for Jerusalem, to venerate the Holy Places, visiting on his way home the Italian shrines of St. Michael, at Monte Gargano, and Saint Nicholas, at Bari. He is next found in Rome and still later at Tunis.

In these journeys Giles was always at pains to procure by manual labor what food and shelter he needed. At Ancona he made reed baskets; at Brindisi he carried water and helped to bury the dead; at Rome he cut wood, trod the wine-press, and gathered nuts; while the guest of a cardinal at Rieti he insisted on sweeping the house and cleaning the knives. He said: "Happiness is to do bodily labor for the love of the Most High and not to take any lesser wages than Paradise for the good work one does."

A keen observer of people and events, Giles acquired in the course of these travels much valuable knowledge and experience, which he turned to good account. He took every opportunity to preach to the people. His sermons were brief and heartfelt talks, replete with homely wisdom; he never minced his words, but spoke to all with apostolic freedom. After some years of activity Giles was assigned by Francis to the hermitage of Monteripido, outside Perugia, where he began a life of contemplation and ecstasy which continued until his death.

Giles was a stranger to theological and classical learning, but engaged in constant contemplation of heavenly things. Men of all social classes were drawn to Perugia to hear Giles teach. The answers and advice these visitors received were remembered, talked over, and committed to writing, and thus was formed a collection of the familiar "Dicta" or "Sayings" of Giles. Bonaventure held these "Sayings" in high esteem, and they are cited in the works of many subsequent ascetical writers. They are short, pithy, popular counsels on Christian perfection, applicable to all classes. Known for their mysticism, humanity, and originality, they faithfully reflect the early Franciscan spirit and teaching.

It was in 1262, on the fifty-second anniversary of his reception into the Order of Friars Minor, that Giles died, already revered as a saint. His immemorial cultus was confirmed by Pope Pius VI in 1777, and his feast day is celebrated on the 23 April.

== Books ==
- Golden Words – The Sayings of Brother Giles of Assisi, by Nello Vian, Franciscan Institute Publications, 1990. ISBN 9780819900401
- O'Reilly, Bernard (1897). "Sayings of Brother Giles, one of the First Disciples of St. Francis of Assisi" . Beautiful pearls of Catholic truth. Henry Sphar & Co.
