= Egide Fologne =

Egide Fologne (1830–1919) was a Belgian entomologist who specialised in microlepidoptera.

He was a member of the Société entomolologique de Belgique (Royal Belgian Entomological Society).

== Works ==
Partial list

- Fologne, E. 1860. Lépidoptères et chenilles observés en Belgique. Annales de la Société Entomologique Belge 4: 108-112.
- Fologne, E. 1863. Addenda au catalogue des Lépidoptères de Belgique. Annales de la Société entomologique de Belgique 7:87–93.
