= Giles (surname) =

The surname Giles or Gyles comes from the given name Giles. Bearers of this surname derive from the original followers of St Giles. They became a prominent family in the north-east of England in the mid 20th Century following their purchase of St Giles' Church and subsequently the founding of Gilesgate as a suburb of Durham.

== People ==
- Adam Giles (born 1973), Australian politician, Chief Minister of the Northern Territory (2013–2016)
- Alan Giles (priest) (1902–1975), Anglican priest, RAF Chaplain-in-Chief (1953–1959), Dean of Jersey (1959–1970)
- Alan Giles, British businessman, CEO of HMV Group (1999–2006)
- Alfred Giles (disambiguation), multiple people
- Alice Giles (born c. 1961), Australian classical harpist
- Annabel Giles (1959–2023), Welsh model, panellist and novelist
- Andrew Giles (born 1973), Australian politician
- Anstey Giles (1860–1944), full name William Anstey Giles, surgeon and medical administrator in South Australia
- Aquila Giles (1758–1822), American lawyer, politician and soldier
- Archie Giles (1895–1941), Australian rules footballer
- Arthur Giles (1864–1936), British gynecologist
- Ashley Giles (born 1973), English cricketer
- Barney M. Giles (1892–1984), American military officer, commander of the Fourth Air Force (1942–1943)
- Bascom Giles (James Bascom Giles; 1900–1993), Texas Land Commissioner (1939–1955)
- Bernard Giles (born 1953), American serial killer
- Bill Giles (American football) (1932–1998), American football player and coach
- Bill Giles (baseball) (born 1934), honorary National League President
- Bill Giles (meteorologist) (born 1939), meteorologist and television presenter
- Billy Giles (1957–1998), Ulster Volunteer Force volunteer
- Bob Giles (born 1930), Australian rules footballer
- Brian Giles (second baseman) (born 1960), Major League Baseball player
- Brian Giles (born 1971), American Major League Baseball outfielder
- Bryant Giles (died 2018), Australian politician
- C. J. Giles (Chester Jarrel Giles, Jr.; born 1985), American-Bahraini basketball player
- Calum Giles (born 1972), English field hockey player
- Calvin Giles (born 1962), American politician, member of the Illinois House of Representatives (1993–2007)
- Cameron Giles, American rap artist
- Carl Giles (1916–1995), British cartoonist
- Catherine Dawson Giles (1878–1955), British watercolour painter
- Charles Tyrrell Giles (1850–1940), British lawyer and Conservative politician
- Chris Giles (born 1982), Welsh footballer
- Chris Giles (Irish footballer) (1928–2006)
- Christy Giles, Republic of Ireland footballer
- Clement Giles, South Australian parliamentarian (1887–1902)
- Cornelis Giles, 18th century Dutch navigator after whom Gilessundet is named
- Craig Giles, Australian country musician
- Curt Giles (born 1958), Canadian ice hockey defenceman
- Daniel Giles (c. 1725 – 1800), Governor of the Bank of England (1795–1797)
- David Giles (disambiguation), multiple people
- Dorothy Giles (1892–1960), American non-fiction author
- Edmund Giles, English lawyer and politician, member of the House of Commons (1656)
- Edward Giles (1566–1637), English politician, High Sheriff of Devon (1612–1613)
- Edward Giles (Australian politician) (1882–1946), Australian politician
- Eric Giles (1939–1990), New Zealand cricketer
- Ernest Giles (1835–1897), Australian explorer
- Felix Giles (engineer) (1885–1950), Australian engineer and ANZAC officer
- Francis Giles (1787–1847), British canal engineer and surveyor
- Frank Giles (1919–2019), editor of the British Sunday Times newspaper (1981–1983)
- Frank Lucas Netlam Giles (1879–1930), British soldier and military attaché
- Frank S. Giles (1915–1991), American politician, Member of the Massachusetts House of Representatives (1947–1961)
- Gail Giles, American writer of young adult fiction
- Gary Giles (1940–2014), New Zealand cricketer
- Geoffrey Giles (1923–1990), Australian politician
- George Giles (baseball) (1909–1992), Negro leagues first baseman
- George Giles (cyclist) (1913–1973), New Zealand cyclist
- George Michael James Giles (1853–1916), English surgeon and entomologist
- Glenn Giles (born 1956), Australian rules footballer
- Godfrey Douglas Giles (1857–1941), war artist
- Godwin Giles (1876–1955), English cricketer
- Grover A. Giles (1892–1974), Attorney General of Utah (1941–1949)
- Gwen B. Giles (1932–1986), American politician, member of the Missouri Senate
- Harriet E. Giles (1828–1909), American educator, co-founder of Spelman College
- Harry Giles (disambiguation), multiple people
- Henry Giles (1809–1882), Unitarian minister and writer
- Herbert Giles (1845–1935), British diplomat, Sinologist and linguist
- Hiram Giles (1820–1895), American politician
- Howard Giles (born 1946), British-American sociolinguist
- Ian Giles (disambiguation), multiple people
- Jack Giles (Leonard George "Jack" Giles 1921–1994), Australian rules footballer and cricketer
- James Giles (disambiguation), multiple people
- Janice Holt Giles (1905–1979), American author
- Jarvis Giles (born 1990), American football running back
- Jesús Giles Sánchez (1961–2012), Mexican politician
- Jimmie Giles (born 1954), American football player
- Jimmy Giles (footballer) (born 1946), English footballer and manager
- Jo Giles (1950–2011), New Zealand television presenter and sport shooter
- John Giles (disambiguation), multiple people
- Jonathan Giles (born 1988), Australian rules footballer
- Johnny Giles (born 1940), Irish football player, manager and pundit
- Katharine Giles (1978–2013), British climate scientist
- Keelan Giles (born 1997), Welsh rugby union player
- Keir Giles (born 1968), British writer and international affairs experts
- Ken Giles (born 1990), American baseball pitcher
- Kenneth Giles (died 1974), British crime writer
- Kevin Giles, Australian Anglican pastor, and theologian
- Kevin S. Giles (born 1952), American journalist
- Lamar Giles, American children's book author
- Lavarus Giles (born 1986), American and Canadian football running back
- Lee Giles, American computer scientist
- Leslie Giles (1906–1981), New Zealand cricketer
- Lionel Giles (1875–1958), Victorian scholar, translator, son of Herbert
- Lucy Giles (born c. 1969), first female College Commander at the Royal Military Academy Sandhurst (since 2015)
- Margaret Giles (1868–1949), British painter, sculptor and medallist
- Martin Giles (born 1979), English footballer
- Martyn Giles (born 1983), Welsh footballer
- Michael Giles (born 1942), drummer with King Crimson
- Marcus Giles (born 1978), Major League Baseball outfielder
- Maureen Giles (born 1938), Australian Olympic swimmer
- Molly Giles (born 1942), American writer
- Nancy Giles (born 1960), American actress and commentator
- Nathaniel Giles (1558 – 1633 or 1634), English Renaissance organist and composer
- Nathaniel Giles (priest) (1591 – not earlier than 1644), Canon of Windsor (1624–1644)
- Nick Giles, managing director of Ordnance Survey Leisure Limited
- Norman Giles (1915–2006), American microbial geneticist
- Olivia Aroha Giles, New Zealand artist and writer
- Owen Giles, English rugby player
- Patrick Giles (politician) (1899–1965), Irish politician
- Patrick Giles (ice hockey) (born 2000), American ice hockey player
- Patricia Giles (née White; 1928–2017), Australian Senator (1981–1993)
- Paul Giles (born 1961), Welsh footballer and manager
- Peter Giles (disambiguation), several people
- Randall Giles (1950–2010), American composer, Episcopal Church missionary, and ethnographer
- Ray Giles (born 1961), Welsh rugby union player
- Richard P. Giles, American politician
- Robert Giles (civil servant) (1846–1928), British civil servant, Commissioner in Sind (1900–1902)
- Robert Giles (born 1933), American journalist
- Roger Giles, judge of the Court of Appeal of the Supreme Court of New South Wales
- Ron Giles (1919–2010), English cricketer
- Ron Giles (born 1942), American television executive
- Ronald Giles, Chief Judge of Michigan's 36th District Court
- Roscoe Giles, American physicist and computer engineer
- Roscoe Conkling Giles (1890–1970), American surgeon, President of the National Medical Association (1935)
- Roy Giles, British soldier and academic
- Ryan Giles (born 2000), English footballer
- Sam Giles, British palaeobiologist
- Samantha Giles (born 1971), English actress
- Samantha Giles (golfer) (born 1994), English golfer
- Sandra Giles (born Lelia Bernice Giles; 1932–2016), American actress and model
- Selina Giles (born 1972), English actress and writer
- Stephen Giles (born 1972), Canadian canoeist
- Stephen M. Giles, Australian children's book author
- Thomas Giles (disambiguation), multiple people
- Tim Giles, British jazz drummer
- Tony Giles, Australian rules footballer
- Trevor Giles, Gaelic footballer for Meath GAA
- Vinny Giles (Marvin M. Giles III; born 1943), American amateur golfer
- Warren Giles (1896–1979), National League executive in Major League Baseball
- Wenona Giles, Canadian academic
- William Giles (disambiguation), multiple people
- Winston Giles (born 1974), Australian musician

== Fictional characters ==
- George Giles, protagonist of the 1966 novel Giles Goat-Boy by John Barth
- Rupert Giles, from the Buffy the Vampire Slayer television series
- William Giles, a fictional inmate in the TV series Oz
- Giles family, a fictional family featured in cartoons by Carl Giles

== See also ==
- Gilles (surname)
- Gillis (surname)
- Gyles, a list of people with the given name or surname
- Morgan-Giles (disambiguation), including a list of people with the surname
