= Ron Giles =

Ron Giles may refer to:

- Ron Giles (cricketer) (1919–2010), English cricketer who played for Nottinghamshire
- Ron Giles (television executive) (born 1942), American television executive
- Ronald Giles, Chief Judge of Michigan's 36th District Court
- Carl Giles (Ronald Giles, 1916–1995), English cartoonist for the Daily Express

== See also ==
- Giles (surname)
- Ronald
