= Henry Giles (disambiguation) =

Henry Giles (1809–1882) was a minister and writer.

Henry Giles may also refer to:

- Henry Gyles (1640–1709), or Giles (1640?–1709), English glass painter

== See also ==
- Giles (surname)
- Harry Giles (disambiguation)
