= John Thom =

John Thom is the name of:

- John Thom (soldier) (1891–1941), British lieutenant-colonel, judge and politician
- John Hamilton Thom (1808–1894), Irish Unitarian minister
- John Nichols Thom (1799–1838), Cornish wine-merchant and maltster
