= Mary Stott =

British feminist and journalist (1907–2002)

- Portrait by Jane Brown, 2004
- Born: Charlotte Mary Waddington; 18 July 1907; Leicester, England
- Died: 16 September 2002 (aged 95)
- Occupations: Feminist; journalist
- Known for: Founder of The Guardian's women's page
- Spouse: Ken Stott (m. 1937)

Mary Stott OBE (born Charlotte Mary Waddington) (18 July 1907 – 16 September 2002) was a British feminist and journalist. She was editor of The Guardian newspaper's women's page between 1957 and 1972.

Charlotte Mary Waddington was born in Leicester, England, the only daughter and third child of Robert Guy Waddington and his wife, born Amalie Bates. Robert and Amalie Waddington were both journalists. In 1937, she married Ken Stott, who was a journalist for the News Chronicle.

In November 2005, she was posthumously included (one of just five women) in the Press Gazette's 40-strong "gallery" of most influential British journalists.

== Archives ==
Papers of Charlotte Mary Stott are held at The Women's Library at the Library of the London School of Economics, ref 7CMS

== Sources ==
- BBC Radio 4 programme on Mary Stott - listen online: https://www.bbc.co.uk/programmes/b00xpp68
- Lena Jeger, Obituary - Mary Stott, The Guardian, 18 September 2002.
- M. Stott, 1975, Forgetting's No Excuse (London: Virago).
- M. Stott, 1985, Before I go (Autobiography part 2)
- Eleanor Mills, with Kira Cochrane, "Cupcakes and Kalashnikovs"
