= The Winston Giles Orchestra =

Australian band

- Origin: Melbourne, Australia
- Genres: Alternative rock, psychedelic rock, neo-psychedelia, space rock
- Years active: 1999–present
- Labels: MGM Playup music
- Members: Winston Giles; Dorian West; CJ Dolan
- Website: http://www.winstongilesorchestra.com/

The Winston Giles Orchestra is an Australian band formed in 2004 by Australian singer-songwriter Winston Giles (Atari Baby, Floor 13). In 2005, the band released two albums and embarked on tours across Australia, the US and Europe.

Currently, the Winston Giles Orchestra consists of Winston Giles (vocals, guitars, piano, beats, and samples) and Dorian West (trumpet, flugelhorn, and keyboards). The band often features guest musicians who make regular appearances.

Although the Winston Giles Orchestra takes an indie rock and post-punk approach to rock music, the band is also known for their psychedelic arrangements, spacey lyrics, and unconventional song and album titles. They have been praised for their live shows, which incorporate video projections, complex stage-light configurations, acrobatics, hula hoop and dancers.

== History ==
Winston Giles spent eight years fronting an art-punk band called Floor 13. After this, he worked with DJs and producers in Australia and released albums, remixes and videos under the name "Atari Baby".

In early 2004, Giles met producer C.J. Dolan, who was behind the electronica outfit, Quench. In 2004, they began recording and mixing the debut album, Soundtracks for Sunrise. It was released in Australia in December 2004.

The second album, A Magnificent Beautiful Day, featuring eleven songs written by Giles, was released in 2005.

During live performances, the band lineup includes Winston Giles on guitars and vocals, and Dorian West on horns, keyboards, and beats.

In 2006, the band embarked on their first overseas tour, at festivals and clubs across the UK and the US.

== Band members ==
As of 2007, The Winston Giles Orchestra consisted of:

=== Core members ===
- Winston Giles (lead vocals, guitars, producer)
- Dorian West (trumpet and lead vocals; recorder and resonator)
- CJ Dolan (producer)

== Discography ==
=== Studio albums ===
- Magnificent Beautiful Day (2004)
- Soundtracks for Sunrise (2005)

=== Singles ===
- "Welcome to the Hotel" features on Chris Coco's electroacoustic compilation (2006).
