= Robert Giles (disambiguation) =

Robert Giles (1933–2023) was a journalist.

Robert or Bob Giles may also refer to:

- Robert Giles (civil servant) (1846–1928)
- Robert Giles (MP), son of John Giles (MP fl. 1417–1435)
- Bob Giles (1930–2023), Australian rules footballer
