= Chris Giles (Irish footballer) =

Irish footballer (1928–2006)

Personal information
- Full name: Christopher Joseph Giles
- Date of birth: 17 July 1928
- Date of death: 27 November 2006 (aged 78)
- Place of death: Dublin, Ireland
- Position: Outside right

Senior career*
Years	Team	Apps	(Gls)
1947–1950	Drumcondra	26	(4)
1950–1953	Doncaster Rovers	27	(4)
1953	Aldershot		
1953–1955	Portadown		
- Distillery
- Bray Wanderers
- T.E.K. United
1966–1967	Boksburg	15	(1)

International career
1950	Republic of Ireland	1	(0)

Managerial career
- 2001–2005: Sheriff YC (Assistant coach)
- * Club domestic league appearances and goals

Christopher Joseph Giles (17 July 1928 – 27 November 2006) was an Irish soccer international player, who was capped once for the Republic of Ireland at senior level, at home to Norway in November 1950.

== Career ==
In 1947–48, in his first season with Drumcondra, he narrowly missed out on a League and Cup double. The Drums won the Championship only to lose in the FAI Cup final 2-1 to Shamrock Rovers. Giles won a second league medal with Drumcondra in 1948–49.

== International ==
Giles made his only appearance for Ireland on 26 November 1950 against Norway national football team.

== Personal life ==
He was son of John Giles and Cousin of Matt Giles & Dickie Giles. His nephew Johnny would go on to win numerous medals with Leeds United and captain and manage the Irish national team. His grand nephew Chris and Michael would both play in the League of Ireland as well.
