= James Giles =

James Giles may refer to:

- James Giles (porcelain decorator) (1718–1780)
- James Giles (general) (1759–1825), American military officer and lawyer
- James Giles (painter) (1801–1870), Scottish painter
- James Giles (Australian politician), Australian politician
- James Giles (philosopher) (born 1958), Canadian philosopher and psychologist
- James Bascom Giles (1900–1993), American politician
- James LeRoy Giles (1863–1946), mayor of Orlando
- James T. Giles (born 1943), U.S. federal judge
- James Giles (British politician), British politician

== See also ==
- Jim Giles (disambiguation)
