= Jim Giles =

Jim Giles may refer to:

- Jim Giles (reporter), co-founder of Matter, an online science magazine
- Jim Giles (meteorologist) (1939–2006), television meteorologist in Tulsa, Oklahoma
- Jimmie Giles (born 1954), American football player
- Jimmy Giles (footballer) (born 1946), English footballer and manager
- Jimmy Giles (rugby union) (1910–1967), English rugby union player

== See also ==
- James Giles (disambiguation)
