= Peter Giles =

Peter Giles may refer to:

- Peter Giles (actor) (born 1971), Canadian actor
- Peter Giles (countertenor) (born 1939), British countertenor and voice teacher
- Peter Giles (musician) (born 1944), British bass player and vocalist
- Peter Giles (philologist) (1860–1935), philologist and master of Emmanuel College, Cambridge
- Peter Giles (canoeist) (born 1970), Canadian sprint kayaker
- Peter Giles (footballer) (born 1958), Australian footballer

== See also ==
- Pieter Gillis (1486–1533), humanist and friend of Thomas More
- Peter de Giles (1927–2015), British Olympic rower
