= James Giles (Australian politician) =

Australian politician

James Giles was an Australian politician.

He was a squatter outside politics. He was one of Charles Cowper's 21 appointments to the New South Wales Legislative Council in May 1861, but never took his seat. Nothing further is known of him.
