= William Giles =

William and Bill Giles may refer to:

- Bill Giles (American football) (1932–1998), head football coach at Chadron State College Fort Hays State University
- Bill Giles (baseball) (William Yale Giles, 1934–2026), longtime Philadelphia Phillies executive and part owner
- Bill Giles (meteorologist) (William George Giles, born 1939), meteorologist and television presenter
- William Giles (colonial manager) (1791–1862), CEO of the South Australia Company, 1841–1860, and member of the South Australian colonial legislature
- William Giles (Oz), fictional character on HBO's prison drama Oz, played by Austin Pendleton
- William B. "Buck" Giles (1903–1985), American baseball player
- William Branch Giles (1762–1830), American statesman
- William Fell Giles (1807–1879), U.S. Representative from Maryland
- William Henry Giles Kingston (1814–1880), writer of tales for boys
- William L. Giles (1911–1997), president of Mississippi State University, 1966–1976
