= Quench (musician) =

Australian musician

Christopher J. Dolan, who performs as Quench, is an Australian dance music producer and musician.

Quench's single, "Dreams" was issued in November 1993 as one of four tracks on a split extended play, via Sirius Music. It was written by Dolan, and co-produced by Dolan with Sean Quinn. It was re-released in 1994 and was nominated for the ARIA Award for Best Dance Release at the ARIA Music Awards of 1995. It peaked at No. 9 on the French singles chart, and No. 75 on the United Kingdom Singles Chart. By October 2000 it had sold over a million copies worldwide.

Quench released albums Sequenchial in 1994 and Consequenchial in 2000.

== Discography ==
=== Studio albums ===
List of albums, with selected chart positions
Title	Album details	Peak chart positions
Title	Album details	AUS
Sequenchial	Released: August 1994; Label: Sirius Music (SM80003); Formats: CD, Cassette	143
Conse-Quench-Ial	Released: October 2000; Label: DanceNet (NET 129.1); Formats: 2×CD	

=== Compilation albums ===
List of compilation albums, with selected details
Title	Album details
Dreams	Released: 2003; Label: House Nation (HN 72051–2); Formats: CD

=== Singles ===
List of singles, with selected chart positions
Title	Year	Peak chart positions			Album
Title	Year	AUS	FRA	UK	Album
"Feel My Love" / "Rhythmic Playground"	1993	—	—	—	non album single
"Dreams"	1993	106	9	75	Sequenchial
"Hope"	1994	—	—	—	Sequenchial
"Be Good to Me"	1995	128	—	—	non album single
"Lone Ranger"	1999	—	—	—	Conse-Quench-Ial
"Embrace the Sunshine" (featuring Lisa Worley)	2000	100	—	—	Conse-Quench-Ial

== Awards and nominations ==
=== ARIA Music Awards ===
The ARIA Music Awards is an annual awards ceremony that recognises excellence, innovation, and achievement across all genres of Australian music.

Year	Nominee / work	Award	Result
1995	"Dreams"	Best Dance Release	Nominated
