= Thomas Giles =

Thomas Giles, Gyles or Gilles may refer to:

- Thomas Giles (pastoralist) (1820–1899), settler in South Australia
- Thomas A. Giles (1916–1970), Canadian politician, Nova Scotia, 1949 to 1953
- Thomas Giles, pseudonym used by American musician Tommy Giles Rogers Jr.
- Thomas Gyles (fl. 1402–1406), MP for Dover
- Tom Gilles (born 1962), American former professional baseball player
