= Frank Lucas Netlam Giles =

British soldier

Colonel Frank Lucas Netlam Giles (1879-1930), D.S.O., O.B.E. was a British soldier- serving with the Royal Engineers- and military attaché.

Giles was only son of Frank Giles, ICS (North West Province and Oudh), Secretary and Member of the provisional legislative council and Superintendent of Dehra Dun a descendant of the canal and railway engineer Francis Giles. Relatives included Alfred Giles, MP for Southampton, and Sir Charles Tyrrell Giles, K.C.

He was educated at Marlborough and the Royal Military Academy, Woolwich.

Giles served in Boer/South African War, 1902 (Queen's Medal, three clasps); was part of European War, 1914–17, the West African Frontier Force (WAFF) / Kamerun campaign in Kamerun / Cameroons Expeditionary Force 1914-1916 (despatches), and was made Lieutenant-Colonel while serving in France in 1916-18 (despatches).

After the Great War Giles served as British Commissioner on the (Serbo) Yugoslav-Bulgarian International Frontier Commission between 1920 and 1922/23 and the (Serbo) Yugoslav-Albanian International Frontier Commission (Albanian Frontier Commission) between 1922 and 1925. He was promoted to Colonel (temporarily) on 30 May 1925. Military attaché to Serbia, Croatia, Slovenia (SCS) in Belgrade and Athens, 1925-until summer 1929. He was a member of the United Service Club; and lived (1928) at Thurlston House, Fleet, Hants, and with the British Legation, in Belgrade and Athens.

== Family ==
In 1916, he married Elgiva Mary (1890-1970) younger daughter of Captain Charles Ackland-Allen (1854-1934), JP, of The Cross, St Hilary, Vale of Glamorgan, near Cowbridge.

Their children were Frank Thomas Robertson Giles (31 July 1919 – 30 October 2019) and Elizabeth Elgiva Giles (1917-2005).
