= John Hamilton Thom =

Irish Unitarian minister

John Hamilton Thom (10 January 1808 – 2 September 1894) was an Irish Unitarian minister.

== Life ==
He was a younger son of John Thom (died 1808), born on 10 January 1808 at Newry, County Down, where his father, a native of Lanarkshire, was Presbyterian minister from 1800. His mother was Martha Anne (1779–1859), daughter of Isaac Glenny.

== Family ==
On 2 January 1838, married Hannah Mary Rathbone (1816–1872), second daughter of William Rathbone V. They had no children.

== Ministry ==
In 1823 he was admitted at the Belfast Academical Institution as a student under the care of the Armagh presbytery. He became assistant to Thomas Dix Hincks as a teacher of classics and Hebrew, while studying theology under Samuel Hanna.

The writings of William Ellery Channing made him a Unitarian; he did not join the Irish remonstrants under Henry Montgomery, but preached his first sermon in July 1829 at Renshaw Street Unitarian Chapel, Liverpool. Shortly afterwards he was chosen as the minister of the Ancient Chapel, Toxteth Park, Liverpool. On 10 May 1831 he was nominated as successor to John Hincks as minister of Renshaw Street Chapel, and entered on the pastoral office there on 7 August, having meanwhile preached (17 July) the funeral sermon of William Roscoe, the historian; this was his first publication.

The arrival of James Martineau in Liverpool in 1832 gave him a close associate; in 1833 his interest in practical philanthropy was stimulated by the visit of Joseph Tuckerman from Boston, Massachusetts. A personal connection with Joseph Blanco White began in January 1835. At Christmas of that year he was a main founder of the Liverpool Domestic Mission.

In July 1838 he succeeded John Relly Beard as editor of the Christian Teacher, a monthly which developed (1845) into the Prospective Review (see John James Tayler). From February to May 1839 he contributed four lectures, and a defensive ‘letter,’ to the Liverpool Unitarian controversy, conducted in conjunction with Martineau and Henry Giles, in response to the challenge of thirteen Anglican clergy. Thom's chief antagonist was Thomas Byrth.

On 25 June 1854 he resigned his charge, and went abroad for travel and study. His place at Renshaw Street was taken by William Henry Channing (1810–1884), nephew of the Boston divine. He returned to Renshaw Street in November 1857, and ministered there till his final retirement on 31 December 1866. From 1866 to 1880 he acted as visitor to Manchester New College, London. His last public appearance was at the opening (16 November 1892) of new buildings for the Liverpool Domestic Mission.

Late in life, his eyesight failed, and for a short time before his death he was blind. He died at his residence, Oakfield, Greenbank, Liverpool, on 2 September 1894, and was buried on 7 September in the graveyard of the Ancient Chapel, Toxteth Park.

== Works ==
His Life of Blanco White, 1845, was his best known work.

Other works were:

- Memoir prefixed to Sermons by John Hincks, 1832.
- St. Paul's Epistles to the Corinthians, 1851 (expository sermons).
- Letters, embracing his Life, by John James Tayler, 1872, 2 vols; 2nd ed. 1873.
- Laws of Life after the Mind of Christ, 1883 (sermons); 2nd ser. 1886.

Posthumous were:

- A Spiritual Faith, 1895 (sermons; with portrait and memorial preface by Martineau).
- Special Services and Prayers, 1895 (unpublished).

His Hymns, Chants, and Anthems, 1854, was a Unitarian hymn-book.

His papers are held at the University of Liverpool.
