= Nick Giles =

British businessman

- Born: Nick Giles; June 4, 1973 (age 52); Hampshire, UK
- Education: The Institute of Direct Marketing
- Occupation: Managing Director of Ordnance Survey Leisure Ltd

Nick Giles is the Managing Director of Ordnance Survey Leisure Limited, part of Ordnance Survey, Great Britain's Mapping authority. He was previously Head of Sales and Marketing for RAC, and has also held roles in LV= (Liverpool Victoria), RSA Insurance Group and Mail Marketing International.

A regular representative of Ordnance Survey in the media, he has appeared in a number of interviews about the design of new map symbols by the public, discussing the launch of a new app, a national photography competition, revised paper maps with digital downloads, Open Data and a map trade-in scheme.

In 2018 he was also appointed to the board of the Outdoor Industries Association (OIA)., then appointed as Chair in 2022.

In 2022, he was awarded an OBE as part of the New Years' Crown Honours Lists for services to the health of the nation.
