= Morgan-Giles =

Morgan-Giles may refer to:

- Francis Charles Morgan-Giles (1883–1964), British boat designer and builder
- Morgan Morgan-Giles (1914–2013), British politician and Royal Navy rear-admiral
- Wilfrid Scott-Giles (1893–1982), English writer on heraldry
- Morgan-Giles Limited, a boatyard in Devon owned by Francis Morgan-Giles
