= Ian Giles =

Ian Giles may refer to:

- Ian Giles (footballer) (1918–2002), Australian footballer
- Ian Giles (singer) (born 1954), English folk singer with Magpie Lane
