= Archie Giles =

Australian rules footballer

Personal information
- Full name: Archibald Frederick Giles
- Born: 6 July 1895; West Melbourne, Victoria
- Died: 5 April 1941 (aged 45); Ascot Vale, Victoria
- Height: 180 cm (5 ft 11 in)
- Weight: 83 kg (183 lb)

Playing career^{1}
Years	Club	Games (Goals)
1919–1920	Essendon	4 (0)
1925–1926	North Melbourne	13 (2)
Total		17 (2)
- ^{1} Playing statistics correct to the end of 1926.

Archibald Frederick Giles (6 July 1895 – 5 April 1941) was an Australian rules footballer who played for the Essendon Football Club and North Melbourne Football Club in the Victorian Football League (VFL).
