= Giles family =

Fictional cartoon family published in newspapers

The Giles Family in "Power Cut", Daily Express (January 15, 1963). Clockwise from the left: Ernie, Bridget, George Jr, Vera, Mother, Father, Grandma, Carol, Ann and the twins, plus dogs under the table and cat behind Grandma's chair. Missing are George and the parrot.

The Giles family is a fictional British family created by cartoonist Carl Giles at the end of World War II, appearing first on 5 August 1945. Much of Giles's World War II work had been cartoons featuring Adolf Hitler, Benito Mussolini and the typical British Tommy, but he felt the need to expand after the War, hence the family. The format was a single-panel cartoon, published daily in the Daily Express and Sunday Express newspapers from 1945 until 1991. An annual collection was published each Christmas.

== Characterisation ==
The family belongs to the better-off British working class and is usually seen living in a semi-detached house. The scenes in which they are depicted usually comment on a topic headlining the news of the day. The Giles family is patriotic but suspicious of authority. The ages of the family members remained the same throughout the 46-year run of the cartoon series, but their home, their hobbies, and their dress reflected the changing British fashions and standard of living.

The Giles family consists of the following:

- Grandma, the most distinctive character of the series. Always present but rarely given a direct voice. Despite what Father might think, Grandma is the ultimate head of the family, due to perpetual belligerence, ruthlessness and an iron will. She is a proper battle-axe of a woman, who is crossed at one's peril, and is sometimes shown to be armed with a variety of weapons including occasional firearms. Grandma is often seen using unexpected items such as skis, a motorbike, a hang glider or a Sinclair C5, or playing the tuba. Despite her fearsome moods and behaviour, and the challenges of her encroaching age, she enjoys life's pleasures (including drinking tea and booze, betting, and bullying anyone who gets in her way).
- Father, Grandma's son. Generally a mild and philosophical character, but possessed of an evil (if impotent) temper and a corrosive vocabulary of (unseen) swear-words when annoyed or thwarted in daily life. Father still deludedly regards himself as the head of the family, out of laziness and entitlement more than anything else. He works, but it's never revealed where. He is passionate about boats, football, racing, fishing, betting, and hiding from the younger, louder family members. Would do anything for a quiet life and is often seen lounging in the garden.
- Mother, Father's wife. The family's de facto leader if not necessarily its head, since she organises everyone else, tends to be the voice of reason (or restrained sarcasm) and cheerfully tackles endless housework and mountains of cooking for the extended Giles family.
- George, Mother and Father's elder son, is an avid reader and is very rarely seen without a book in his hands. Smokes a Sherlock Holmes style pipe, wears a beret and sandals, and never speaks. Absent in later cartoons. He is married to the skinny, bespectacled, fragile Vera who constantly suffers from a cold or other ailments, and who is often both Grandma's companion and the butt of her bullying. They have one baby son, George Jr., the youngest member of the family. George Jr. usually plays the baby role in the ensemble, but he was also known for taking over the cartoons whenever Giles himself was ill or indisposed, writing long scrawling childish accounts of what had been happening (complete with crude miniature cartoons around the edges).
- Ann, the eldest daughter, and her toddling babies, the twins, Lawrence and Ralph. The twins' absent father is a G.I.. While non-speaking, the twins already have a well-developed sense of cunning and are often found involved in general mayhem or committing various acts of sabotage, while wearing identical smirks.
- Carol, blonde daughter, always seen lounging about reading magazines.
- Ernie, the younger son, still a child. A smaller version of Father in looks and attitude, but with a child's cheekiness.
- Bridget, the youngest daughter, also still a child. Wears a gymslip and has never been in any trouble because she never gets caught.
- Grandma's Parrot, called Attila the Hun.
- Butch the dog, a shaggy Airedale Terrier.
- Second dog, a Border Collie.
- Natalie, a black cat.

Recurring associates of the family are:

- Larry (aka "Stinker"), the smirking mop-haired kid from next door and constant companion of the children in the family. When not up to mischief, he can be seen with a camera recording the mischief or embarrassing situations involving others. Larry is another non-speaking character, but is generally the one who can be seen in the background escalating any situation via additional action or the sneaky use of extra equipment. Larry appears to have an affinity with technology and science, in particular for its mischievous applications - at one point, he created multiple tiny clones of himself during a school science lesson, resulting in several subsequent cartoons with a miniature crowd of Larrys following him around.
- Chalkie, the schoolmaster, a sardonic walking skeleton of a man with a savagely sarcastic sense of humour, who instils terror in his students. Modelled on one of Giles's own teachers.

== Cultural legacy ==
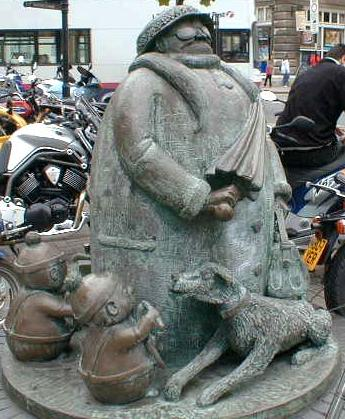
Statue of Grandma in Queen Street, Ipswich

There is a statue of Grandma in Queen Street in Ipswich, England where she stands looking up at the newspaper office window where Carl Giles used to work. Grandma made a cameo appearance in DC Comics' Superman: True Brit and Alan Moore's League of Extraordinary Gentlemen: Black Dossier. The appearance of Mrs. Henriot-Gulch in the comic Cerebus is closely based on Grandma.

In the 1980s the family appeared in television cartoon advertisements for Lyons Quick Brew tea, one of which included Grandma racing around on her motorbike.

== Sources ==
- Carl Giles Biography British Cartoon Archive, University of Kent. Accessed April 2008.
