= Roscoe Giles =

American computer scientist

- Born: April 6, 1949 (age 77); Oakland, California, U.S.
- Education: University of Chicago (BS); Stanford University (PhD)
- Scientific career
- Institutions: Massachusetts Institute of Technology; Boston University
- Thesis: Quarks and Bubbles: The Dynamics of a Field Theory Model of Hadron Structure (1975)
- Doctoral advisor: Sidney Drell
- Doctoral students: Lawrence M. Krauss
- Website: www.bu.edu/ece/people/faculty/a-g/roscoe-giles/

Roscoe C. Giles, III is an American physicist and computer engineer. He was the deputy director of Boston University's Center for Computational Science. He is also a professor of computer and electrical engineering at Boston University College of Engineering, with a joint appointment in physics.

== Early life and family ==
Giles grew up in a neighborhood on the South Side of Chicago, and attended high school in nearby Hyde Park at the University of Chicago Laboratory Schools. His first exposure to computers was through access to the School of Education's IBM 1620.

Giles' grandfather and namesake was Roscoe Conkling Giles, the first Black person to earn a degree from Cornell University Medical College.

== Academic biography ==
Giles earned his bachelor's degree in Physics at the University of Chicago in 1970. In 1975 he received his doctorate from Stanford University, becoming the first African American to earn his Ph.D. in theoretical physics from that school. At Stanford, he worked with Sidney Drell on the Stanford Linear Accelerator Center (SLAC).

He was a research associate at SLAC and the MIT Center for Theoretical Physics before becoming an assistant professor at the Massachusetts Institute of Technology from 1979 to 1985, at which point he joined the Boston University faculty as an associate professor, and was promoted to full professor in 1999.

== Research area of interest ==
Advanced computer architectures, distributed and parallel computing, and computational science

== Other activities ==
In 2002 Giles was the chair of the Supercomputing Conference in Baltimore, becoming the first African American to take this role. In 2004 he became the first faculty member to serve on the BU board of trustees.

Roscoe Giles is the founder and executive director for the Institution of African American E-Culture. This foundation was developed to deal with the problem of the digital divide, or the lack of access to information technology by minority groups and other poor communities in the US.

Giles was also a team leader in the National Science Foundation's National Partnership for Advanced Computational Infrastructure (NPACI) Education, Outreach and Training group, through which students and teachers learned to use advanced computing systems for understanding, modeling and solving problems. As of 2010, he is the chair of the United States Department of Energy's Advanced Scientific Computing Advisory Committee.

== Awards and honors ==
In 2000 Giles won the A. Nico Habermann Award offered by the Computing Research Association for "outstanding contributions aimed at increasing the numbers and/or successes of underrepresented groups in the computing research community". In 2004 he was listed by the Career Communications Group as one of the "50 Most Important Blacks in Research Science".
