= Kenneth Giles =

British writer

Kenneth Giles (1922–1974) was a British crime writer. Giles wrote books under his own name, as well as the pseudonyms Charles Drummond and Edmund McGirr.

Giles started as a sporting journalist, and used what he learned there as background for the Drummond novels. The Drummond books star Sgt. Reed, while the McGirr books star a private detective.

In a New York Times review of Death among the Stars, the American crime fiction critic Allen J. Hubin writes "It will be a long while before I have had enough of Mr. Giles." The American critic Anthony Boucher, in a New York Times review of A Provenance of Death, Giles' first novel to be published in the United States, describes the author as "promising", and the novel's detective as a "real working pro".

== Incomplete bibliography ==
- Some Beasts No More (1965)
- The Big Greed (1966)
- A Provenance of Death (1966)
- The Funeral Was in Spain (1966) (as Edmund McGirr)
- Death at the Furlong Post (1967) (as Charles Drummond)
- Death in Diamonds (1967)
- Death and Mr. Prettyman (1967)
- The Lead-Lined Coffin (1968) (as Edmund McGirr)
- The Odds on Death (1969) (as Charles Drummond)
- Here Lies My Wife (1967) (as Edmund McGirr)
- A Hearse with Horses (1967) (as Edmund McGirr)
- Death among the Stars (1968)
- Death Cracks a Bottle (1969)
- Death and the Leaping Ladies (1969) (as Charles Drummond)
- An Entry of Death (1969) (as Edmund McGirr)
- A Death in the Church (1970)
- Stab in the Back (1970) (as Charles Drummond)
- Murder Pluperfect (1970)
- No Better Fiend (1971) (as Edmund McGirr)
- A Death at the Bar (1972) (as Charles Drummond)
- The Lead-Lined Coffin (?) (as Edmund McGirr)
- An Entry of Death (?) (as Edmund McGirr)
- Death Pays the Wages (as Edmund McGirr)
- A File on Death (1973)
- Bardel's Murder (1973) (as Edmund McGirr)
- A Murderous Journey (1974) (as Edmund McGirr)
