= Leslie Giles =

New Zealand cricketer

Personal information
- Full name: Leslie Albert Giles
- Born: 2 January 1906; Christchurch, New Zealand
- Died: 1 June 1981 (aged 75); Auckland, New Zealand
- Batting: Right-handed

Domestic team information
- Years: Team
- 1929/30: Otago
- Source: ESPNcricinfo, 12 May 2016

Leslie Albert Giles (2 January 1906 – 1 June 1981) was a New Zealand sportsman. He played one first-class cricket match for Otago in 1929/30.

Giles was born at Christchurch in 1906. He was educated at Otago Boys' High School in Dunedin and later worked in the railway industry. As well as cricket, he played rugby union for Otago, playing in 17 representative matches for the province between 1927 and 1931. Following his death in 1981, obituaries were published in the New Zealand Cricket Almanack and in the following year's Wisden.
