= Johnny Giles =

Irish footballer and manager

John Giles
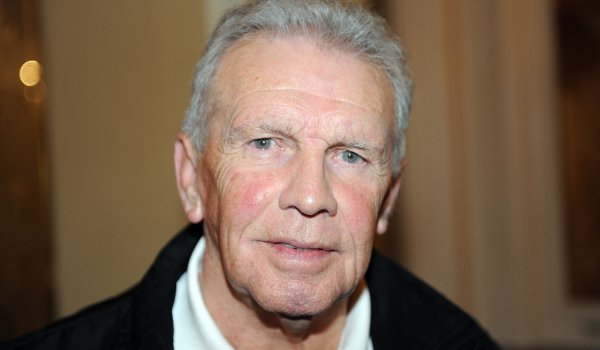
- Giles pictured in 2013

Personal information
- Full name: Michael John Giles
- Date of birth: 6 November 1940 (age 85)
- Place of birth: Dublin, Ireland
- Height: 1.61 m (5 ft 3 in)
- Position: Midfielder

Youth career
- 1954–1956: Stella Maris
- 1956–1957: Manchester United

Senior career*
Years	Team	Apps	(Gls)
1957–1963	Manchester United	99	(10)
1963–1975	Leeds United	383	(88)
1975–1977	West Bromwich Albion	75	(3)
1978	Philadelphia Fury	21	(0)
1977–1983	Shamrock Rovers	42	(11)
Total		620	(112)

International career
1959–1979	Republic of Ireland	59	(5)

Managerial career
- 1973–1980: Republic of Ireland
- 1975–1977: West Bromwich Albion
- 1977–1983: Shamrock Rovers
- 1981–1983: Vancouver Whitecaps
- 1984–1985: West Bromwich Albion
- * Club domestic league appearances and goals

Michael John Giles (born 6 November 1940) is an Irish former association football player and manager best remembered for his time as a midfielder with Leeds United in the 1960s and 1970s. After retiring from management in 1985, Giles served as the senior analyst on RTÉ Sport's coverage of association football from 1986 until 2016. He was nominated for the 1972 Ballon d'Or and the FAI voted Giles as the greatest Irish player of the last 50 years at the UEFA Jubilee Awards in 2004.

After winning an FA Cup winner's medal under Matt Busby at Manchester United, Giles moved to Leeds in 1963 where he played in midfield alongside captain Billy Bremner. The duo formed a central midfield partnership which was one of the best in English and European club football. Their pairing helped yield several major trophies in the most successful era in Leeds' history. Giles and Bremner both scored 115 goals for the club.

In his later years in football, Giles pursued a managerial career which saw him installed as player-manager and manager of, among others, West Bromwich Albion, the Republic of Ireland, Vancouver Whitecaps and Shamrock Rovers. Despite having an outstanding knowledge of the game, Giles personally never liked being a manager. He became disillusioned with aspects of the job, such as suffering at the hands of non-committal boardrooms, and left management permanently in 1985. He later declared that he had no regrets about quitting managerial life.

After repeated encouragement from childhood friend Eamon Dunphy, Giles inadvertently entered the world of football punditry in 1986 and became a senior analyst on RTÉ Sport until 2016. In December 2019, he was employed as an analyst for Premier Sports' live coverage of the English Premier League matches. Also, he writes two columns per week for the Irish Evening Herald newspaper, and offers his opinions about the game on radio station Newstalk 106.

== Club career ==
Giles grew up in Ormond Square, a working class area of inner-city Dublin, where he developed many of the skills that would aid him in becoming a professional footballer. He was encouraged to enter the game through his father Christy who played for Bohemians in the 1920s and managed Drumcondra during the 1940s.

Growing up, Giles remarked "I didn't consider myself Irish". This was due to the outsider status of association footballers in the mainstream sports-life of the Republic, where Gaelic Games were a much more dominant force in the '50s of his youth.

Giles was spotted in Dublin playing for Stella Maris, before he began his English career with Manchester United. He joined Matt Busby's team for a £10 signing-on fee in 1956. He was given an early first-team debut in 1959 after eight of the team died in the Munich air disaster in February of the previous year. Among the dead was Bill Whelan, who was five years older than Giles and also came from the Cabra district of Dublin.

He was also chosen to play for the Republic of Ireland team by the age of 18.

Giles was a regular first-team player over the next four years, playing alongside Bobby Charlton and Denis Law. Manchester United won the FA Cup in 1963, where Giles played the defence-splitting pass which started the move towards a winning goal by David Herd.

After being out of favour, he asked for a transfer and joined Leeds United for £33,000. "I am going to haunt him", is what Giles said of Busby, to his wife Anne, after the Scotsman had forced his departure when freezing him out of the starting team.

Giles would soon evolve into one of the finest central midfielders in England, as Leeds won the Second Division title in his first season there. In 1965, he was in the team which came close to a League championship and FA Cup "double" but missed out on both, to Manchester United and to Liverpool respectively.

Giles formed a strong partnership with Billy Bremner as Leeds manager Don Revie built a new team around them. The players had similarities in their styles and were a tremendous foil for one another. Giles was known as the creative force and Bremner as the ball-winner, but each was capable of doing the other's primary job.

In the 1967–68 season Leeds won both the League Cup and the Fairs Cup. That was the first season in which Giles was affected by injury, which meant he missed the second leg of the Fairs Cup final. In the 1968–69 season, Giles was instrumental in Leeds becoming league champions in a then record 67 points from 42 matches at 2 points for a win, a record that stood for ten seasons. In 1970, Giles again had a magnificent season as Leeds chased three trophies but lost all three, the League went to Everton; the FA Cup to Chelsea after a replay; and the European Cup campaign ended at the hands of Celtic in the semi-finals.

In the fifth round of the 1971 FA Cup, when Leeds were unexpectedly beaten 3–2 by Colchester United, Giles scored Leeds' second goal as they almost came back from 3–0 down. Leeds regained the Fairs Cup but lost the League title on the last day, with Arsenal getting the victory they needed to earn the championship and form one half of a successful "double" bid.

Leeds won their first FA Cup and Giles his second when they defeated Arsenal 1–0 at Wembley in 1972, yet again they missed out on the League on the final day of the season after defeat to Wolverhampton Wanderers. Sunderland and A.C. Milan beat Leeds in the finals of the FA Cup and the European Cup Winners Cup in 1973, rendering Leeds trophyless again. Jack Charlton's retirement in 1973 also left Giles as the most senior member of the squad. In the same year, he started to combine his Leeds duties with a spell as player-manager of his country.

In 1974, a 29-match unbeaten run at the start of the season helped Leeds coast to their second title, but then controversy reigned after Revie quit to take over the England team. Revie recommended to the Leeds board of directors that Giles, nearly 34 and approaching the end of his playing career, should be his successor. The board instead appointed Brian Clough, a brilliant manager but a controversial choice as he had been publicly critical of Leeds in the past and was not an admirer of Revie. Clough and the players never got on – the players had wanted Giles too – and the board reacted by dismissing Clough with a big pay-off after just 44 days in charge. Giles still did not get the job though (that went to Jimmy Armfield) and concentrated on playing as Leeds chased a place in their first European Cup final. Giles himself never applied for the Leeds vacancy on those two occasions, his name had instead been put forward as a candidate by others. Also in 1974, Giles was nominated—along with Danny Blanchflower—by Bill Nicholson as his successor at Tottenham Hotspur. The Spurs board appointed Terry Neill instead.

Giles was outstanding in Leeds' European campaign but was no longer an automatic fixture in the side. After appearing in the 1975 final, which Leeds lost 2–0 to Bayern Munich, Giles accepted an offer in June 1975 from West Bromwich Albion to become their player-manager, while still playing for and managing the Irish team.

== Status within the game ==
Giles is widely regarded as one of the greatest footballers to have come out of the Republic of Ireland. High tributes have been conferred on Giles by hugely successful former managers such as Alf Ramsey, Matt Busby and Brian Clough. His status at Leeds United was noted when supporters there named him in the greatest Leeds XI of all time. His place in English football history was recognised in 1998 when the Football League, as part of its centenary celebrations, listed Giles on its list of 100 League legends. When Giles was quizzed as to the differences between himself and another highly regarded former Irish player, Roy Keane, he said: "If forced to compare us, I'd say I was slightly more creative than him and he [Keane] was a better ball-winner."

== Reputation as a hard player ==
In the early part of his career, Giles endured some rough treatment. This occurred when he suffered a career-threatening ankle injury at the hands of Birmingham City's Johnny Watts, and knee ligament damage sustained when tackled by Eddie McCreadie at Stamford Bridge. Being a creative and diminutive figure, Giles thereafter accepted he would have to become a tougher player in order to avoid being singled out by opponents. On later becoming a pundit, Giles at length wrote about how he felt he had to become "a lion rather than a lamb" on the pitch so as to help achieve his full potential. His primary reason for this was to avoid being labelled a hypocrite when the time came for him to give judgement on tough tackling by others.

== Player-manager career ==
Giles showed much promise as a young player-manager of the Republic of Ireland, as he combined his duties in charge of West Brom, where after a slow start, he won the majority of Baggies supporters over. Under his leadership, they were promoted from the Second Division in April 1976, and finished 7th in the First Division in 1976–77. He recently said the time he spent at West Brom was amongst the happiest of his career despite him not winning trophies there. However, his spell at the club also witnessed several clashes with the club's board over the financial running of the club, an area that Giles felt the board excluded him from too much. Giles even tendered his resignation over the matter on the day promotion was secured, although he was persuaded to change his mind and oversee the First Division campaign. He resigned as player-manager at West Brom on 21 April 1977, the very same day as his former team-mate Jack Charlton resigned his managerial post at Middlesbrough, and moved back to Ireland to manage Shamrock Rovers until 1983.

He returned to the Hawthorns for a second spell as manager during the 1983–84 season, steering the side to safety despite losing his first game in charge 1–0 to Third Division Plymouth Argyle in the FA Cup. The following season saw Albion start well and they were as high as 5th at Christmas, but finished 12th. However Giles' decision to sell fan favourite Cyrille Regis and top scorer Garry Thompson led to supporter disgruntlement, with the replacements Giles signed - Garth Crooks and Imre Varadi - proving unsuccessful. He resigned as manager in October 1985 following a 3–0 defeat at Coventry City, a record ninth consecutive defeat for Albion. Youth team manager Nobby Stiles, who was also Giles' brother-in-law, replaced him although, despite a slight improvement in results, the club could not climb off the foot of the table and, under Ron Saunders, finished in bottom place.

== Managing career ==
=== Republic of Ireland ===
As player-manager of the Republic of Ireland between October 1973 and March 1980, Giles oversaw a revival in the fortunes of the national side which had struggled for the previous decade. The 1976 European Championship qualifiers saw the international debut of Liam Brady and a more respectable showing. In the 1978 FIFA World Cup qualifiers, the side finished only two points short of qualification, defeating France at home during that campaign.

=== Shamrock Rovers ===
During his five-and-a-half-year spell in charge at Glenmalure Park Rovers won the FAI Cup in 1978, he scored 2 goals in 4 appearances in the European Cup Winners Cup and captained Ireland nine times, scoring once. Giles played his last game on 14 December 1980 at Milltown, he was 40 years of age.

He resigned at Milltown on 3 February 1983, after having left his Ireland job in March 1980, and ventured across the Atlantic for spells in charge of clubs in the North American Soccer League. In 1981, he was hired to coach the Vancouver Whitecaps of the NASL. He held that position for three seasons, being named the 1982 North American Soccer League Coach of the Year.

== Media career ==
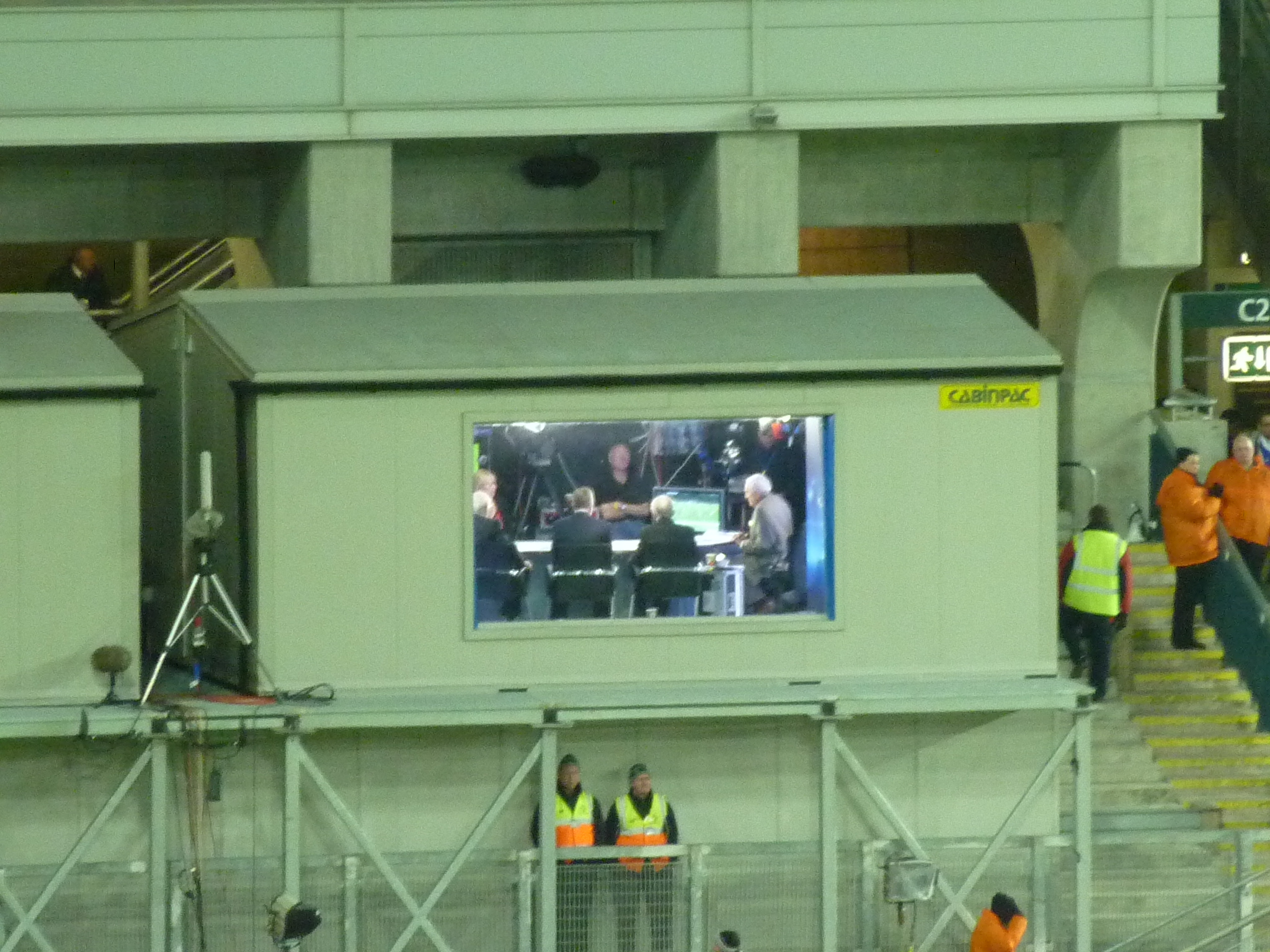
Johnny Giles (second seat from the right inside the little box) and the rest of the RTÉ soccer panel at Croke Park during the first leg of the 2010 FIFA World Cup play-off with France

Giles later returned to Ireland and settled into a much-admired career in journalism and started out as a pundit on Raidió Teilifís Éireann (RTÉ) in November 1986. He featured on Premier Soccer Saturday and its international and European soccer coverage, particularly their coverage of games involving the Republic of Ireland national football team. Giles contributed to RTÉ Sport's coverage of the 2010 World Cup where prior to it starting he correctly predicted Spain would win the tournament. He is the leading soccer analyst on Newstalk.

Of the English Premier League, Giles is often critical of the methods of modern coaching, and in particular, younger managers, saying in 2016:

When you hear the younger managers talking, it's all about tactics now. If their players are not playing well, they change the formation. There's nothing about not passing the ball to each other or misplacing passes. It's all about, well the tactics were wrong. I've seen it so often, you hear it on the television as well. Their team is playing very poorly, they're 2–0 down at half-time, they're giving the ball away, kicking it out of play. Well what do you have to do, and they start talking about changing the formation. No matter what formation you play you have to pass the ball to each other.

He was also part of RTÉ Sport's studio coverage of the 2014 FIFA World Cup.

Giles left RTÉ Sport after UEFA Euro 2016 after 30 years with the broadcaster, his last appearance was on the night of the Euro 2016 final.

== Retirement ==
Giles resides in the Harborne area of the city of Birmingham in England. He has played golf for many years, and at one time, played off a handicap of five, but with his advancing age his handicap has risen to 12 - "a bad 12", he claims. To coincide with his 70th birthday in 2010, Giles wrote an autobiography chronicling his life both in and outside football, which was released in November 2010. Titled A Football Man, it became the best-selling book in the Republic of Ireland. In it, he says he is an admirer of cricket, attending the occasional game in his spare time as a footballer.

== Media portrayals and successful legal action ==
Giles was portrayed by actor Peter McDonald in the 2009 film The Damned United, which centred on Brian Clough's ill-fated 44-day spell as Leeds United manager in 1974. Giles successfully sued David Peace, author of the 2006 book on which the film was based. Giles said of Peace: "His book was outrageous. I'm portrayed as the scheming leprechaun. He [Peace] had me in conversations with Clough that never happened. It made Clough out to be a wild man whereas he wasn't drinking then. I didn't get on with him but I found him highly intelligent. Peace said the novel was fiction based on fact, adding "trouble is, people assume it's the official version. The movie was a misinterpretation of the misinterpretation that was the book!"

In another interview in relation to his taking court action, Giles said: "I took my stand because I was the only one alive who could do anything about it. The Clough family had no comeback. They couldn't do anything as Brian was dead, that was a huge influence (on taking the legal action)."

As part of the settlement in the 2008 High Court dispute, the publisher of the book, Faber and Faber, was ordered to remove from any future editions the references perceived by Giles as damaging and untrue.

== Family ==
In 1966, Giles married Anne, sister of Irish Olympic sprinter Paul Dolan, with whom he had four sons and two daughters. Two of his sons, Michael and Chris, played for Shamrock Rovers; Michael from 1981 to 1983 and Chris from 1993 to 1995. Giles' father, Christy Giles, played for Bohemians in the 1920s and won a league title in his first season at Dalymount Park. His uncle, Chris Giles, also played for Ireland. Giles was a brother-in-law of the late Nobby Stiles, his former Manchester United team-mate, who married into the Giles family. Giles' uncle Matt managed Transport to FAI Cup success in 1950.

== John Giles Foundation ==
In 2008, the Football Association of Ireland founded a non-profit trust to fund grassroots clubs and football at youth level. Giles, who had previously hosted charity golf events to raise money for good causes, allowed the FAI the right to use his image for the charitable organisation, thus giving rise to the John Giles Foundation. This would involve grassroots clubs taking part in sponsored walks called the "Walk of Dreams", whereby half the money raised by each club would go to the club themselves, and the other half going to clubs selected by the foundation.

The inaugural event in 2011 was met with negative criticism, as the main walk ending at the Aviva Stadium was marred by inadequate toilet facilities at the stadium endpoint, along with expensively priced food, a lack of bottled water and the absence of Republic of Ireland senior international footballers, whose attendance at the event had been promised, all of which went on to be discussed on RTÉ Radio 1's Liveline programme.

While the John Giles Foundation raised some €700,000 for its causes during its lifetime, it emerged in 2019 that the FAI, under the stewardship of John Delaney had paid over €500,000 to former footballer Con Martin jnr, for the concept of the foundation, the fundraising walks and a kit-purchasing idea, payments for which were unknown to Giles at the time.

In September 2022, the FAI announced the winding down of the John Giles Foundation, with a final donation of €55,000 being made to the FAI's Football For All schools programme.

== Career statistics ==
=== Club ===
Appearances and goals by club, season and competition
Club	Season	League			FA Cup		League Cup		Total	
Club	Season	Division	Apps	Goals	Apps	Goals	Apps	Goals	Apps	Goals
Manchester United	1959–60	First Division	10	2	0	0	0	0	10	2
Manchester United	1960–61	First Division	23	2	0	0	2	1	25	3
Manchester United	1961–62	First Division	30	2	7	1	0	0	37	3
Manchester United	1962–63	First Division	36	4	6	1	0	0	42	5
Manchester United	1963–64	First Division	0	0	0	0	1	0	1	0
Manchester United	Total		99	10	13	2	3	1	115	13
Leeds United	1963–64	Second Division	40	7	3	0	2	0	45	7
Leeds United	1964–65	First Division	39	7	7	1	0	0	46	8
Leeds United	1965–66	First Division	40	6	2	1	12	0	54	7
Leeds United	1966–67	First Division	29	12	7	2	12	4	48	18
Leeds United	1967–68	First Division	20	7	5	1	10	2	35	10
Leeds United	1968–69	First Division	32	8	0	0	7	0	39	8
Leeds United	1969–70	First Division	32	13	9	2	9	4	50	19
Leeds United	1970–71	First Division	34	13	4	2	8	1	46	16
Leeds United	1971–72	First Division	38	6	7	4	6	0	51	12
Leeds United	1972–73	First Division	33	6	8	1	8	1	49	8
Leeds United	1973–74	First Division	17	2	2	0	0	0	19	2
Leeds United	1974–75	First Division	29	1	7	1	9	0	45	2
Leeds United	Total		383	88	61	15	83	12	527	115
West Bromwich Albion	1975–76	Second Division	38	2	4	0	5	1	47	3
West Bromwich Albion	1976–77	First Division	37	1	0	0	4	1	41	2
West Bromwich Albion	Total		75	3	4	0	9	2	88	5
English career total			557	101	78	17	95	15	730	133

=== International ===
Appearances and goals by national team and year
National team	Year	Apps	Goals
Republic of Ireland	1959	1	1
Republic of Ireland	1960	3	0
Republic of Ireland	1961	4	1
Republic of Ireland	1962	2	0
Republic of Ireland	1963	3	0
Republic of Ireland	1964	5	1
Republic of Ireland	1965	3	0
Republic of Ireland	1966	4	0
Republic of Ireland	1967	1	0
Republic of Ireland	1968	2	1
Republic of Ireland	1969	2	0
Republic of Ireland	1970	2	0
Republic of Ireland	1971	1	0
Republic of Ireland	1972	1	0
Republic of Ireland	1973	1	0
Republic of Ireland	1974	5	0
Republic of Ireland	1975	4	0
Republic of Ireland	1976	3	0
Republic of Ireland	1977	4	0
Republic of Ireland	1978	5	1
Republic of Ireland	1979	3	0
Total		59	5

=== Managerial ===
Managerial record by team and tenure
Team	From	To	Record				
Team	From	To	P	W	D	L	Win %
West Bromwich Albion	5 July 1975	24 May 1977	101	41	31	29	40.6
West Bromwich Albion	14 February 1984	29 September 1985	75	24	15	36	32.0
Total			176	65	46	65	36.9

== Honours ==
Manchester United

- FA Cup: 1962–63

Leeds United

- Football League First Division: 1968–69, 1973–74
- Football League Second Division: 1963–64
- FA Cup: 1971–72; runner-up: 1964–65, 1969–70 1972–73
- Football League Cup: 1967–68
- FA Charity Shield: 1969
- Inter-Cities Fairs Cup: 1967–68, 1970–71
- European Cup runner-up: 1974–75

Shamrock Rovers

- FAI Cup: 1978
- Tyler Cup: 1978–79

Individual

- Rothmans Golden Boots Awards: 1972, 1973
- Ballon d'Or nominee: 1972
- PFA Team of the Year: 1973–74 First Division
- 100 League Legends: 1998
- UEFA Jubilee Award – Republic of Ireland's Golden Player: 2004
- English Football Hall of Fame: 2010 Inductee
- Trinity College Dublin honorary doctorate: 2013
- FAI Hall of Fame: Inducted 2020
