= Arthur Giles =

English gynecologist (1864–1936)

Arthur Edward Giles FRCOG FRCS (1864-1936) was a gynecologist who was appointed as Physician to Out-Patients at the Chelsea Hospital for Women in 1893. He was a founding fellow of the Royal College of Obstetricians and Gynaecologists.

== Early life and education ==
Born on 22 December 1864, he received his early education at the City of London School, the Manchester Grammar School, and the Lycee, Havre. He attended Owens College, Manchester (now the Victoria University of Manchester) and qualified in medicine in 1888.

In 1898 he married May Tindall, the daughter of Albert A. Tindall, founder of the publishing house Balliere, Tindall and Cox, He was an active member of the Worshipful Company of Drapers.

== Career highlights ==
He worked in Manchester and at the General Lying-in Hospital in London before taking up his position at the Chelsea Hospital for Women. He maintained a Harley Street office. He also held posts at the Prince of Wales Hospital, Tottenham, Sutton Hospital, Pasmore Edwards Hospital, Edward Green and the Epping Hospital. in 1909, Giles became the first Consultant Surgeon to the newly established Queen Victoria Memorial Cottage Hospital in Welwyn, a position which he held until his death in 1934.

During the First World War he served with the Royal Army Medical Corps.

== Later life and death ==
In 1929, he became President of the Gynaecological and Obstetric Section of the Royal Society of Medicine.

In the early 1930s, he suffered a cerebral thrombosis. He retired in 1934 and died on 26 December 1935.

== Selected publications ==
- Moral Pathology
- A Study of the after-results of Abdominal Operations on the Pelvic Organs. Based on a series of 1,000 consecutive cases
- Menstruation and its Disorders
- The Diseases of Women: A Handbook for Students and Practitioners
- Gynaecological Diagnosis: A Manual For Students And Practitioners
- Anatomy and Physiology of the Female Generative Organs and of Pregnancy
