= Godwin Giles =

English cricketer

Godwin Giles (16 June 1876 — 1 June 1955) was an English cricketer. He was a medium-fast bowler who played for Gloucestershire. He was born in Mere and died in Sunbury-on-Thames.

Giles made a single first-class appearance for the team, during the 1903 season, against Somerset. He scored 8 runs in the first innings in which he batted, and a duck in the second.

Giles bowled nine overs in the match, conceding 31 runs.
