= Olivia Aroha Giles =

New Zealand artist

- Education: Whitireia New Zealand

Olivia Aroha Giles is a New Zealand Māori writer, artist, and designer, specialising in art textiles, design, illustration and writing. She writes children's books, novels, and short stories.

== Early life ==
Giles descends from Ngāti Raukawa, Ngāti Kahungunu, Te Ati Awa, Te Whānau-ā-Apanui, Te Atihaunui-ā-Paparangi and Ngāti Hinekawa, as well as being of Scottish and English descent.

In 2010 Giles graduated from Whitireia New Zealand with a Bachelor of Applied Arts in Textiles.

== Writing career ==
Giles released her first book in 2006 through Learning Media titled Two Homes. This children's book has been distributed through a variety of New Zealand Primary schools and was also re-released in 2008 as an Audiobook.

Giles was also short listed for Huia Publishers prestigious 'Pikihuia Short Story Awards' and was also published in their collection of 18 finalists. Her short story titled; 'Stepping outside the boxing' was a stand out piece in the collection.

In 2013, Giles published her first major novel through Dusky Productions Ltd titled Heart of the Tapu Stone. This book is the first of a three-part trilogy titled 'Threads through the Whariki'. Heart of the Tapu Stone was included in the curriculum at Bonn University, where Giles then lectured, and they translated the novel. The second book in this series; 'Feather from the Kakahu' is due for release at the end of 2015.

Dusky is a Māori publishing company that Giles worked for, and helped start when they asked to publish her first novel, Heart of the Tapu Stone.

== Personal life ==
Giles lives in Porirua, New Zealand and is an active part of the local artistic community. She has worked alongside local artists in the creation of art pieces scattered across the small city, as well as curating and displaying at Pataka Gallery, Porirua. She has been involved in projects with well known New Zealand Maori artists; playwright and actor Tane Mahuta Grey.

Giles and her husband, Scotty, have seven children.
