= David Giles =

David Giles may refer to:

- David Giles (director) (1926–2010), British television director
- David Giles (footballer) (born 1956), Welsh former footballer
- David Giles (sailor) (born 1964), Australian competitive sailor
