= Frank Giles =

English journalist (1919–2019)

Frank Thomas Robertson Giles (31 July 1919 – 30 October 2019) was an English journalist, historian and diplomat, who was editor of the British Sunday Times newspaper from 1981 to 1983, having served as its foreign editor (1961–1977) and then deputy editor (1967–1981) under his predecessor Harold Evans. He stood down in the wake of the Hitler Diaries scandal.

== Background ==
Giles was born in Bayswater, London on 31 July 1919, the only son of Colonel Frank Lucas Netlam Giles (1879–1930), DSO (1915), OBE (1923), and Elgiva Mary Ackland-Allen (1890–1970).

In 1940, the young Bermuda Government House ADC Giles encountered the Edward, Duke of Windsor and his wife Wallis Simpson during their brief visit on their way to the Bahamas. Giles described his impressions at the time most lucidly in his memoirs. He thought that Wallis was: 'a very clever woman, … She is not intrinsically beautiful or handsome but she has a good complexion, regular features and a beautiful figure....More than all the charm of her physical appearance, though, is her manner: she has, to an infinite degree, that really great gift of making you feel that you are the very person whom she has been waiting all her life to meet... With old and young and clever and stupid alike she exercises this charm and during the week she was here, during which she met a number of people, I never saw anyone who could resist the spell — they were all delighted and intrigued… She is never anything but stately, and when she had to wave to the crowds on her arrival, and subsequently whenever we drove through [Hamilton], she did it with ease and charm and grace which suggested that she had been at it all her life.” On returning from Hamilton with a pair of swimming trunks the former king told the ADC: It’s I who wear the shorts in this family, you know.

== Career ==
Giles worked at The Times as a diplomatic correspondent beginning in the 1940s, based in Paris. In 1960, he joined The Sunday Times as its foreign editor. He became editor in 1981.

In his review (New York Times, 17 January 1993) of Rupert Murdoch, Murdoch by William Shawcross (New York: Simon & Schuster, 1993) Andrew Sullivan wrote: 'THE best story in this sprightly, undemanding biography of the media entrepreneur Rupert Murdoch is apocryphal. When Mr. Murdoch fired Frank Giles as editor of The Sunday Times of London in 1983, he proposed that Mr. Giles assume the title "editor emeritus" for the two years remaining before his retirement. Mr. Giles asked what on earth "editor emeritus" meant. "It's Latin, Frank," Mr. Murdoch reportedly replied. " E means 'exit' and meritus means 'you deserve it.'"

Following his resignation, Giles published a memoir in 1986, Sundry Times.

== Personal life ==
In 1946, he married Lady Katherine Pamela Sackville ('Kitty'), only daughter of the 9th Earl De La Warr; they had three children, the youngest of whom, Belinda, is married to television broadcaster David Dimbleby. They were married 64 years, until her death in 2010, had three children.

He was a member of the Society of Dilettanti, Brooks's Club, and Beefsteak Clubs and a member of the St James's Club. In 2009, his 'Hobbies and other interests' were listed as 'Wine (especially claret and burgundy), opera, and watercolour painting. He lived in Maida Vale, London, and also had a home in Corfu, Greece.

He turned 100 in July 2019 and died in London on 30 October that year.

== Bibliography ==
- Frank Giles: Sundry Times. London, John Murray, 1986. ISBN 0-7195-4289-8.
- Frank Giles: A prince of journalists, the life and times of Henri Stefan Opper de Blowitz. Lasalle, Open Court, 1974. ISBN 0-912050-51-9 (1st ed.: London, Faber and Faber, 1962).
- Frank Giles: Napoleon Bonaparte: England's Prisoner (ISBN 1841195995), Carroll & Graf (New York, NY), 2001.
- (Editor) Corfu: The Garden Isle, presented by Count Spiro Flamburiari, photographs by Fritz von der Schulenburg and Christopher Simon Sykes, John Murray (London) and Abbeville Press (New York, NY), 1994.
- Frank Giles: The Locust Years: The Story of the Fourth French Republic, 1946–1958, Secker & Warburg (London, England), 1991, Carroll & Graf (New York, NY), 1994.

Media offices
Preceded by William Rees-Mogg	Deputy Editor of the Sunday Times; 1967–1981	Succeeded by Ron Hall and Hugo Young
Preceded by Harold Evans	Editor of The Sunday Times; 1981–1983	Succeeded by Andrew Neil
