= Harry Giles =

Harry Giles may refer to:

- Harry Giles III (born 1998), American basketball player
- Harry Giles (educator) (born 1930), Canadian educator
- Harry Giles (footballer) (1911–1986), Australian rules footballer with Essendon
- Harry Josephine Giles (born 1986), British writer, singer, and poet

== See also ==
- Harry Gyles (1880–1959), Australian rules footballer with Carlton
- Henry Giles (disambiguation)
