= Roscoe Conkling Giles =

American physician

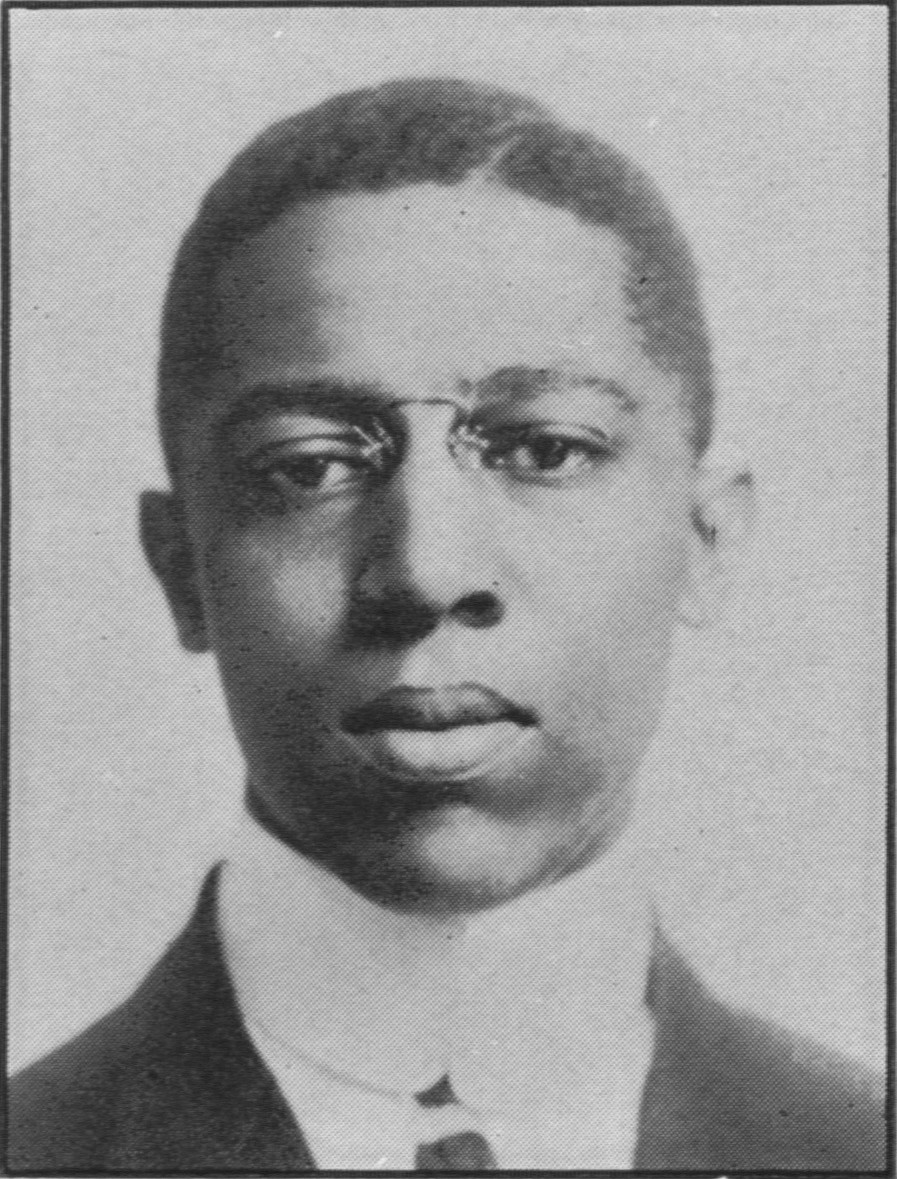
- Student photo, 1911
- Born: 6 May 1890; Albany, New York
- Died: 9 February 1970 (aged 79); Chicago, Illinois
- Education: Cornell University; Cornell University School of Medicine
- Employer: Provident Hospital
- Spouse: Francis Reeder

Roscoe Conkling Giles (May 6, 1890 – February 9, 1970) was an American medical doctor and surgeon. He was the first African American to earn a degree from Cornell University Medical College. Giles worked as a surgeon at Provident Hospital in Chicago, and served as the hospital's Chairman of the Division of General Surgery. In 1915, he became the first African American to lead a city health department. He was elected President of the National Medical Association in 1935.

== Early life and education ==
Dr. Giles was born on May 6, 1890, in Albany, New York, to the Reverend Francis F. Giles and Laura Caldwell Giles. He graduated from Boys High School in Brooklyn, New York, in 1907 and won a scholarship to attend Cornell University in Ithaca, New York. He became one of four students to be initiated into the second class of Alpha Phi Alpha, drafting their fraternity ritual and assisting in drafting their constitution. He became treasurer of the national fraternity while at Cornell and was elected the first president of the Alpha Alumni Chapter while attending Cornell University Medical College in New York City in 1913.

He graduated from Cornell University Medical College in 1915 as the first African American graduate of the program. Dr. Giles reportedly received death threats and was asked to leave the institution due to the color of his skin, though he stayed and graduated with honors.

In 1952, Dr. Giles was named one of Cornell’s distinguished alumni of the year. In 1985, a scholarship fund in his name was established at the Cornell Weill Medical College.

== Career ==
Between 1915 and 1917, Dr. Giles interned at Provident Hospital, in Chicago, Illinois, the first African-American-run hospital in the United States. He passed the exam for Junior Physician at the Municipal Tuberculosis Sanitarium and at the Oak Forest Infirmary at the top of the Civil Service list; at the same time, certification was obtained, but eventually, his appointment was denied due to the color of his skin. In 1917, Dr. Giles was appointed a supervisor of the Health Department by Mayor William Hale Thompson. He was associated with Dr. U.G. Dailey from 1917 to 1925. Dr. Giles became Assistant Attending Surgeon (1917–1925) and then Attending Surgeon (1925–1955).

In 1931, Dr. Giles received a Julius Rosenwald Fellowship to study at the University of Vienna Medical College in Austria. He became an Honorary Attending Surgeon (1956–1970) at Provident Hospital. He was affiliated with a number of professional organizations and was involved in professional activities throughout his life. He was a Fellow of the American College of Surgeons and served as President of the National Medical Association (NMA). He is known within the NMA for chairing what came to be called the "Giles Committee" that successfully lobbied the American Medical Association (AMA) for the removal of the abbreviation "col." after the names of African-American physicians listed in the AMA Directory of Physicians. The Committee continued as a "Special Liaison Committee" between the NMA and the AMA.

Dr. Giles volunteered for service in the Medical Corps of the Army of the United States and entered as a Major on June 13, 1942. He was promoted to Lieutenant Colonel in 1944 and became Chief of the Medical Services at the Thousand Bed Station and Regional Hospital in Fort Huachuca, Arizona. Following World War II, he was promoted to Lieutenant Colonel in the Organized Reserves of the U.S. Army until his death. In 1946, he was appointed a Consultant in Surgery to the Secretary of War through the Surgeon General.

Dr. Giles was a 33rd Degree Prince Hall Mason.

== Personal life ==
Giles married Francis Reeder and had two sons to survive to adulthood: Oscar DePriest Giles and Roscoe Conkling Giles Jr. His grandson Francis R. Giles is a photojournalist and his other grandson Roscoe C. Giles III, is a physicist and computer engineer, and the deputy director of Boston University's Center for Computational Science.

Dr. Roscoe Giles died in Chicago in 1970, and is buried in Lincoln Cemetery.

== Sources ==
- Beatty, William K. "Roscoe Conklin Giles: Pathbreaker and Surgeon." Proc. Inst. Med. Chgo. (Volume 40, 1987)
- Gotto, Antonio M. Jr., MD and Jennifer Moon. Weill Cornell Medicine: A History of Cornell's Medical School. (Cornell University Press, 2016).
- Oshinsky, David (2016). Bellevue: three centuries of medicine and mayhem at America's most storied hospital. Doubleday.
- Roscoe G. Giles Biographical File (Medical Center Archives of NewYork-Presbyterian/Weill Cornell Medicine, New York, NY).
