= Carl Giles =

English cartoonist (1916–1995)

Carl Giles OBE
- Portrait by Jane Brown, 1986
- Born: Ronald Giles; 29 September 1916; Islington, London, England
- Died: 27 August 1995 (aged 78); Ipswich, Suffolk, England
- Occupation: Cartoonist
- Known for: Giles family
- Spouse: Sylvia Clarke (m. 1942; died 1994)

Ronald "Carl" Giles OBE (29 September 1916 – 27 August 1995), often referred to simply as Giles, was a cartoonist who worked for the British newspaper the Daily Express.

His cartoon style was a single topical highly detailed panel, usually with a great deal more going on than the single joke. Certain recurring characters achieved a great deal of popularity, particularly the extended Giles family, which first appeared in a published cartoon on 5 August 1945 and featured prominently in the strip.

== Early life ==
Giles was born in Islington, London, the son of a tobacconist and a farmer's daughter. He was nicknamed "Karlo", later shortened to "Carl", by friends who decided he looked like Boris Karloff, a lifelong nickname. He was actually registered with that name when he died in 1995. After leaving school at the age of 14 he worked as an office boy for Superads, an advertising agency that commissioned animated films from cartoonists like Brian White and Sid Griffiths' animation company also based in Charing Cross Road, London from 1929. When Superads closed in 1931, he gained experience in other small film companies in the area before being promoted to an animator in 1935, beginning to work for producer Alexander Korda on a colour cartoon film, The Fox Hunt. Giles then went to Ipswich to join Roland Davies, who was setting up a studio to produce animated versions of his popular newspaper strip "Come On Steve". Six ten-minute films were produced, beginning with Steve Steps Out (1936), but even though Giles was the head animator, he received no screen credit.

== Career ==
In 1937, Giles started work as a cartoonist for the left-wing Sunday newspaper Reynolds News, for which he drew a weekly topical cartoon and a comic strip, "Young Ernie". His strip came to the attention of the editor of the Sunday Express and in 1943 he was interviewed for a job on the Evening Standard, but was eventually offered a job on the Daily Express and Sunday Express instead, at a higher salary of 20 guineas per week, and he quit Reynolds News. His first cartoon for his new employers appeared in the 3 October 1943 edition of the Sunday Express.

Giles later said that he never agreed with the Daily Express's politics, and felt guilt for abandoning the more left-wing Reynolds News for it, but it made him wealthy: by 1955 he was being paid £8,060 per annum (equivalent to about £200,000 at 2018 prices) for producing three cartoons a week.

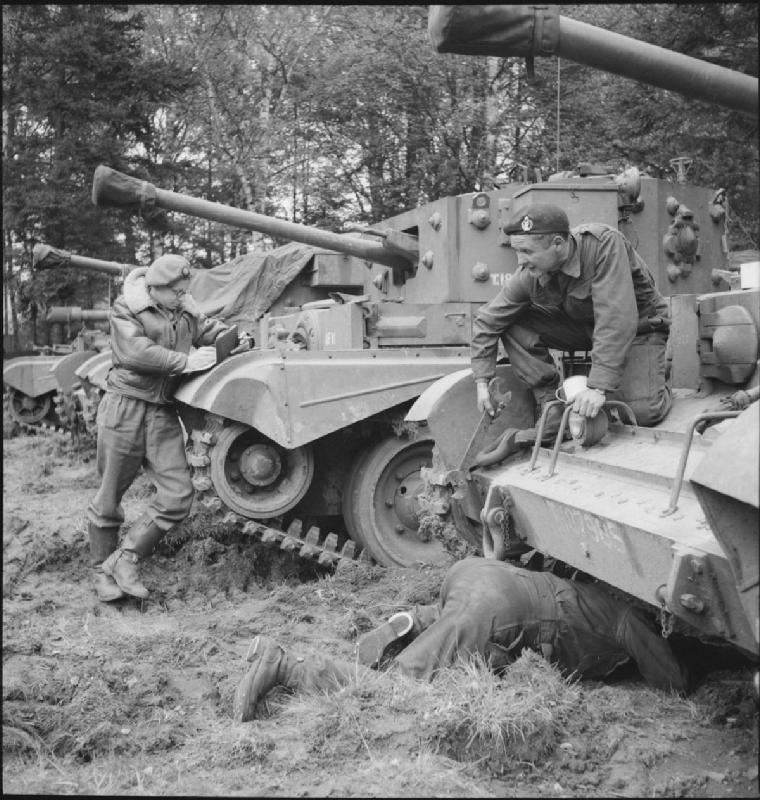
The Express cartoonist Giles sketches as Cromwell tank crewmen work on their vehicles, 1 May 1945.

Giles was rejected for war service for being blind in one eye and deaf in one ear following a motorcycle accident, but made animated shorts for the Ministry of Information, while some of his cartoons were reprinted in poster form for the Railway Executive Committee and others. In 1945 he became the Daily Express's "War Correspondent Cartoonist" with the 2nd Army.

At one point during World War II he was assigned as War Correspondent to the Coldstream Guards unit which liberated the Bergen-Belsen concentration camp. Giles interviewed the camp commandant, Josef Kramer, who turned out to be aware of and an admirer of Giles's work. Kramer gave Giles his Walther P38 pistol and holster, a ceremonial dagger, and his swastika armband, in return asking for a signed original of Giles's work. Giles said:

I have to say, that I quite liked the man. I am ashamed to say such a thing. But had I not been able to see what was happening outside the window I would have said he was very civilised. Odd, isn't it? But maybe there was a rather dishonourable reason. I have always found it difficult to dislike someone who was an admirer of my work. And strangely, Kramer was. I never sent him an original. What was the point? He had been hanged.

The pistol and armband as well as the whip carried by Irma Grese were later given by Giles to a private collector in Suffolk.

In 1959 he was awarded an OBE. Among his fans were the British royal family, who often requested the originals of his work.

Giles's cartoons feature many references to news items, some even quoting a news headline. The topics were typically British and made references to common British goods or attitudes. For example, a cartoon published in 1985 involves a cleaner who has "left her box of Persil just behind the throne" and knocks to be let back in to get it, upon which she is mistaken for Black Rod.

A poster for the Sunday Express in 1982 advertising Giles' work

Giles finally quit working for the Daily Express in 1989; his cartoons had been allocated less and less space in the newspaper, and he said that the last straw was being stood up following a trip to London to lunch with the editor. He continued working for the Sunday Express until 1991.

He never sold any of his creations, preferring to donate them to friends and to charitable organisations, like the RNLI, of which he was Life President, and which continues to issue charity Christmas cards each year bearing his work.

He also contributed cartoons to Men Only and other publications, drew advertising cartoons for Guinness, Fisons and other companies, and designed Christmas cards for the Royal National Institute for the Deaf and Game Conservancy Research Fund.

== Personal life ==
Giles married Sylvia 'Joan' Clarke, his first cousin, on 14 March 1942 in East Finchley. The couple never had children but were married for over 50 years and shortly after their marriage the couple moved to Witnesham, near Ipswich, Suffolk, where they spent the rest of their lives together. The last decade of Giles's life was plagued with failing health, including sight loss and encroaching deafness, and in 1990 he suffered the amputation of both legs due to poor circulation issues. He was reported to have never got over the death of his wife, on Christmas Day 1994, and died himself just over eight months later at Ipswich Hospital on 27 August 1995 aged 78.

The graves of Giles and his wife are located in the churchyard of St Martin's church in Tuddenham St Martin, Suffolk.

== Annual collections of cartoons ==
Giles's cartoons appeared in the Daily Express newspaper and used his cartoon family to illustrate and comment on topics of the day. 'Grandma' seated with knitting appeared in November 1947.

Collections of Giles's cartoons have been produced annually since 1946.

Up until the 50th collection (published in 1996), they were given the title "1st Series", "2nd Series", up to "60th Series" (2007), although since the 1997-published collection, they have been called "The 1998 collection", "The 1999 collection", etc. For reasons unknown the 2005 Collection was subtitled as 56th series, despite the 2003 edition being correctly titled as such and the 2005 release actually being the 58th book.

Until his death in 1995, Giles selected which cartoons would be in the annual.

Up until 1991, when Giles stopped producing new cartoons, the annual consisted of cartoons from the preceding year — for example, in the 42nd series (published in autumn 1989), the cartoons used were originally published in the Daily Express and Sunday Express between 30 June 1987 and 12 June 1988.

From 1991, the annuals consisted of cartoons previously published in collections, although some previously unpublished in annuals were included. The 46th series (1992), 47th (1993) and the 1999–2001 collections are all composed solely of cartoons which had not previously been published in any other collection. The 2002–2006 collections included some cartoons not previously published in any collections.

The 1999–2005 collections included a calendar, with twelve cartoons from the year's collection.

== Celebrity fans ==
Most of the annuals included a foreword from an editor of the Express newspapers or a celebrity fan, including Margot Fonteyn (ballet dancer), Adam Faith (singer), Spike Milligan (comedian), Sir Malcolm Sargent (conductor), Jim Clark (F1 champion), Sean Connery (actor), Frank Sinatra (singer) and Tommy Cooper (comedian and magician).

The 2010 collection had an introduction about Giles, as it was the first year that Hamlyn had published the collection (all previous collections had been published by Express Newspapers). The 2011 collection returned to the tradition of having an introduction written by a celebrity fan (in that case, Lee Latchford-Evans) and the majority of the cartoons featured in the 2011 collection had never previously appeared in an annual.

In June 2017, Dr Tim Benson published the first biography of Giles to be based on the cartoonist's own correspondence in his book 'Giles's War'. Benson discovered that Giles had been dishonest about his reasons for leaving Reynolds News due to the guilt he felt over joining Express Newspapers. The book also discusses how Peter Tory had written a ‘dreadful' book about the cartoonist which was not helped by the fact that the two men loathed each other, while Tory had missed out much of the story of Giles' career and relationships.

== Influences ==
Giles cited his influences as Bruce Bairnsfather and Graham Laidler ("Pont"), and he himself influenced the style of the newspaper cartoonists "JAK" and "Mac". Giles' cartoon 'Back to School Week' of 13 January 1953 inspired Leo Baxendale to create the "Bash Street Kids" for the Beano comic. Giles's work inspired the South African cartoonist Zapiro to pursue the profession and was an important influence.

In April 2000, he was voted "Britain's Favourite Cartoonist of the 20th Century" by visitors to The Cartoon Museum between February and April 2000, also coming second (to Ronald Searle) in a poll amongst cartoonists.

== Tributes ==
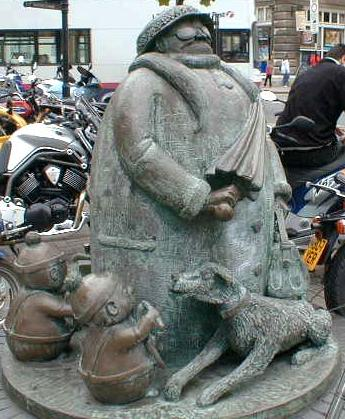
Bronze statue depicting Giles's character "Grandma" in Ipswich, England. She stands looking up at the window of the office where Giles used to work.

In 1993 a bronze statue depicting Grandma looking up at the window of the studio in Ipswich where he used to work was unveiled by Warren Mitchell. Giles, who was by this time using a wheelchair, was present at the unveiling.

He lived in Witnesham and supported Ipswich Town (as shown by cartoons where Grandma is wearing an Ipswich Town scarf).

== Bibliography ==
By Giles

- Golden Jubilee Special Edition (2002)
- Giles VE Day Cartoons (1995)
- Fifty Years At Work (1994)
- Fifty Years At The Express (1994)
- Nurse! (1975)
- Giles At War (1955)
- Children by Giles (1955)
- Cartoons from The Journalist (1948)

About Giles

- Giles: a life in cartoons by Peter Tory (1992)
- The Giles Family by Peter Tory (1993)
- Giles At War by Peter Tory (1994)
- The Ultimate Giles by Peter Tory (1995)
- Grandma by Robert Beaumont (1999)
- Giles's London by John Field (2007)
- Giles's Fighting Forces by John Field (2008)
- Giles: One of the Family: the life and cartoons of Carl Giles from his personal archive by Dr. Nicholas Hiley, British Cartoon Archive, University of Kent (2008) * Catalogue
- The History of the World According to Giles by John Field (2010)
- Giles's War by Tim Benson, Random House Books (2017)
