= Winston Giles =

Australian musician (born 1974)

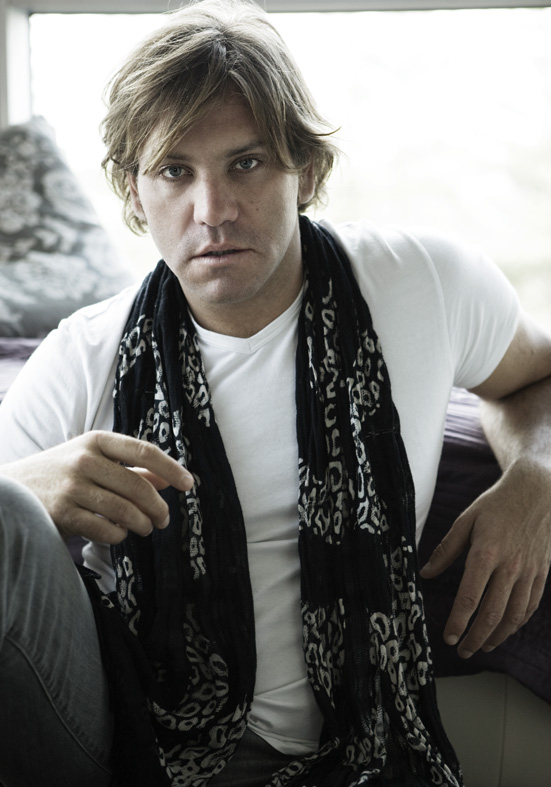

Background information
- Born: Winston Giles; 26 January 1974 (age 52)
- Origin: Australia
- Genres: Electronica; Ambient; Rock
- Instruments: Guitar; Vocals; Bass; Keys
- Years active: 1990–current
- Labels: Playup Music (AUS); Ingrooves / Universal (US); Ingrooves / Universal (UK); Distributed through Universal Music
- Website: http://www.sirwinstonofficial.com http://www.winstongiles.com

Winston Giles (born 26 January 1974) is an Australian musician (singer, songwriter, guitarist and producer). He has released many albums under different monikers including Atari Baby, Floor 13, Winston Giles, Sir Winston, and is best known for his group The Winston Giles Orchestra.

== Biography ==
Winston Giles was born in Melbourne, Australia. His musical aspirations began as a young teenager when he took up guitar and piano. Inspired by bands such as The Beatles, The Velvet Underground and The Cure he spent most of his teens writing, recording and performing.

A chance meeting with the Red Hot Chili Peppers in Melbourne, saw the 19 years old Giles move to the United States. After two years performing and producing in Los Angeles, Giles moved to Austin, Texas, where he met legendary manager and club owner Clifford Antone. Giles become a regular performer at the famous Antone's Blues Club in Austin.

In 1996 Giles formed a new band: "Floor 13" in Australia: an art punk rock band and released an EP titled "The World", that received much airplay on Australia's radio stations. Floor 13 would tour extensively throughout Australia and move to the United States. Floor 13, with a new American line-up, was based primarily in Dallas Texas, where the band recorded several EPs and by the late 1990s had gained notoriety among the scene in "Deep Ellum".

Giles returned to Australia in 2000 and immersed himself in the local emerging dance music scene working with many local DJs and producers, culminating in a project called Atari Baby – releasing a self titled album and many singles, remixes and videos under the moniker. Atari Baby featured elements of trance, big-beat, house and electro.

In 2004 Giles began a new project called The Winston Giles Orchestra, releasing two albums, "Soundtracks for Sunrise" and "A Magnificent Beautiful Day" in 2006. The project grew from shows in Melbourne and Sydney's underground venues such as 161 and Revolver to bigger stages at esteemed music festivals, such as the Kiss My Grass festival. The albums received much critical acclaim with college radio embracing the albums in the United States as did the UK's BBC radio one, and the band toured extensively across Australia, the United Kingdom and the USA.

In October 2008 Giles released "LOVERS" a new album released under his name. An upbeat underground New York sounding album produced by Giles and Don Nadi.

Giles released a new single in July 2019 "Everybody Must Dance" under the moniker "Sir Winston". A second Sir Winston single "Hollywood Hills" was released in July 2020.

Winston Giles is also a recognized music supervisor for fashion brands with his company Playup Music and also owns and runs a publishing company for emerging artists called Young Hero.
