= Glenn Giles =

Australian rules footballer

Personal information
- Full name: Glenn Giles
- Born: 14 November 1956 (age 69)
- Original team: Springvale
- Height: 186 cm (6 ft 1 in)
- Weight: 81 kg (179 lb)

Playing career^{1}
Years	Club	Games (Goals)
1981	Melbourne	2 (0)
- ^{1} Playing statistics correct to the end of 1981.

Career highlights
- Prahran 1987 2nd Division premiership team

Glenn "Jack" Giles (born 14 November 1956) is a former Australian rules footballer who played with Melbourne in the Victorian Football League (VFL).

The older brother of Peter Giles, after leaving Melbourne he would play in the VFA with Prahran and was a member of their 1987 2nd Division premiership team along with his other brother Scotty.

Jack was a key position player who loved a beer.
