= Bob Giles =

Australian rules footballer

Personal information
- Full name: Robert Bernard Giles
- Born: 22 May 1930
- Died: 12 October 2023 (aged 93)
- Original team: South Melbourne Districts
- Height: 178 cm (5 ft 10 in)
- Weight: 76 kg (168 lb)
- Position: Wing

Playing career^{1}
Years	Club	Games (Goals)
1950, 1952–55	South Melbourne	67 (2)
- ^{1} Playing statistics correct to the end of 1955.

Robert Bernard Giles (22 May 1930 – 12 October 2023) was an Australian rules footballer who played with South Melbourne in the Victorian Football League (VFL).

== External golf links ==
- Bob Giles's playing statistics from AFL Tables
- Bob Giles at AustralianFootball.com
