= Henry Giles =

Henry Giles (1 November 1809 – 10 July 1882) was a Unitarian minister and writer.

== Biography ==
Born in County Wexford to a Roman Catholic family, Giles changed his religious belief several times, becoming a Protestant and a Dissenter. He studied for a time at the Royal Academical Institution of Belfast. before finally becoming a Unitarian and officiating as a minister of that denomination in Greenock, Scotland and chapel of Toxteth Park, in the edge of Liverpool, England.

It was during his three years preaching in Liverpool that Giles gained a reputation as a preacher of marked oratorical power. In "the Liverpool Controversy," - an extended debate held in 1839 between thirteen clergymen of the Established Church on one hand, and Giles, along with James Martineau and John Hamilton Thom defending the Unitarian position on the other hand. Giles spoke on the topics "God and Christ," "Man," "Creeds" and "Future Retribution." A record of the debate was published under the name Unitarianism Defended.

In 1840, Giles moved to the United States, where he preached, lectured extensively, and wrote. He was widely known as a lecturer, and his numerous volumes of literary interpretation and criticism were well-received, particularly his Human Life in Shakespeare. Other works included Lectures and Essays (2 vols. 1845), Christian Thoughts on Life (1850), and Illustrations of Genius in Some of its Applications to Society and Culture. He was married in 1849, in Bangor, Maine, to Louise Lord, of Bucksport, Maine, with whom he had two daughters, and a son. One daughter, Nora, was drowned off Bucksport in 1869, at the age of 18, in a sailing accident.

Giles was plagued by a variety of health issues. He had a hunchbacked, dwarfish stature which he claimed resulted from a nurse having let him fall as an infant, injuring his spine. Throughout his life, he struggled with alcoholism; although he initially found strong drink distasteful, he became acclimated to liquor when it was prescribed to him to counter an illness. His public life came to an abrupt halt around 1865, when he suffered a sudden paralytic attack while lecturing in Boston. He lived for 17 years thereafter, and died in Quincy, Massachusetts. He was an avid reader and was proficient in both French and German.
