= Jane K. Brown =

American literary scholar

Jane Kurshan Brown (born 1943) is an American literary scholar, currently the Joff Hanauer Distinguished Professor of Western Civilization Emerita (Germanics and Comparative Literature) at the University of Washington.

== Publications ==
Select works:

- Goethe's cyclical narratives, Die Unterhaltungen deutscher Ausgewanderten and Wilhelm Meisters Wanderjahre, 1975
- Goethe's Faust : the German tragedy, 1986
- Faust : theater of the world, 1992
- Ironie und Objektivität : Aufsätze zu Goethe, 1998
- The persistence of allegory : drama and neoclassicism from Shakespeare to Wagner, 2006
- Goethe's allegories of identity, 2014
