= Christy Giles =

Irish footballer

Christy Giles was an Irish soccer player during the 1920s and 1930s. He was also known as "Dickie".

Giles played for Bohemian FC and Shelbourne FC amongst others during his career in the League of Ireland. He made his debut for Bohs in the game that won them the 1929/30 league title against Bray Unknowns on 28 December 1929. He would later manage Drumcondra

His son Johnny would go on to win numerous medals with Leeds United and captain and manage the Irish national team. His grandsons Chris and Michael would both play in the League of Ireland as well.
