= Ron Giles (cricketer) =

English cricketer

Personal information
- Full name: Ronald James Giles
- Born: 17 October 1919; Chilwell, Nottinghamshire, England
- Died: 30 January 2010 (aged 90); Nottingham, Yorkshire, England
- Batting: Right-handed
- Bowling: Left-arm orthodox spin
- Role: Batter

Domestic team information
- Years: Team
- 1937–1959: Nottinghamshire

Career statistics
| Competition | First-class |
|---|---|
| Matches | 195 |
| Runs scored | 7,639 |
| Batting average | 26.25 |
| 100s/50s | 9/40 |
| Top score | 142 |
| Balls bowled | 2,972 |
| Wickets | 23 |
| Bowling average | 57.30 |
| 5 wickets in innings | – |
| 10 wickets in match | – |
| Best bowling | 3/1 |
| Catches/stumpings | 65/– |
- Source: CricketArchive, 24 October 2024

Ronald James Giles (17 October 1919 – 30 January 2010) was an English first-class cricketer who played for Nottinghamshire from 1937 to 1957, returning for a single game, his benefit match, in 1959. He was born in Chilwell.
